This is a list of episodes for Deadliest Warrior.

Season 1
Deadliest Warrior premiered on April 7, 2009 at 10 pm ET.  Nine one-hour episodes of the show were produced for Season 1. Season 1 was released on DVD and Blu-ray on May 11, 2010.

Episode 1: Apache vs. Gladiator

Apache team: Alan Tafoya (World Champion Knife Fighter), Snake Blocker (U.S. Army Combat Instructor)
Apache weapons: Tomahawk, Knife, Bow & Arrow, War Club
Apache armor: Rawhide Shield

Apache statistics: Height: 5 feet, 7 inches Weight: 140 lbs Gear Weight: 10 pounds

Gladiator team: Chris Torres (Ancient Weapons Specialist), Steven Dietrich (Gladiator Combat Instructor), Chuck Liddell (The Iceman)
Gladiator weapons: Cestus, Scissor, Trident & Net, Sling, Sica
Gladiator armor: Murmillo Helmet, Wooden Shield

Gladiator statistics: Height: 5 feet, 8 inches Weight: 185 lbs Gear Weight: Ranges from 10 lbs to 38 lbs

Though gladiators were class based and each had designated weapons, for this episode a generalized gladiator was used that combined weapons and armor of different classes.  This was done so that the gladiator would be able to compete at different ranges, normally unnecessary in that they had one weapon combination (sword and shield, trident and net, etc.) and only fought other gladiators of opposite classes to optimize the entertainment.
For short-range weapons, the tomahawk was tested against the cestus and the scissor. Snake Blocker tested two types of tomahawk on a gel head: one made of stone and one made of the jaw bone of a horse, both of which tore off the back of the head. However, the tomahawk made from a horse's jawbone visually appeared to cause considerably greater damage. The velocity of the stone tomahawk was measured, but the results were not relayed on the airing of the show. Alan Tafoya then threw iron tomahawks at wood targets and penetrated deep into them, two striking at 29 mph, and one at 32 mph. The cestus and scissor, wielded by Chuck Liddell, were tested on a 400-lb piece of beef. The cestus broke its ribs while the scissor almost cut it in half. Before the cestus test, Chuck Liddell's natural punching speed and power were measured: Liddell's punching speed was clocked at 14 meters per second—almost 50 percent faster than the average Olympic boxer—while his punching power was judged to deliver 1000 pounds of force—enough to break most facial bones on contact. The cestus effectively tripled this. A divided panel gave the edge to the versatility of the tomahawk.
For mid-range weapons, the knife was tested against the trident and net. The knife's versatility was demonstrated when Snake Blocker threw three knives at three targets in under three seconds. Snake Blocker also demonstrated Apache knife fighting techniques, such as the "piercing buffalo", on a dummy garbed as a gladiator and wearing a gladiator's helmet. The trident, wielded by Chris Torres, was then tested on a gel torso and managed to puncture its heart with the main prong, a side prong puncturing the spleen. The trident and net was given the edge due to its flexibility as an offensive-defensive combo.
For long-range weapons, the sling was tested against the bow and arrow. Steven Dietrich launched a lead slingshot at 91 mph. The shot was then simulated by an air cannon which drove a lead slingshot into a gel head and shattered the upper jaw, penetrating just past the nose. Alan Tafoya, wielding the bow and arrow, first fired an arrow at a wooden target as the velocity of the arrow was clocked; the arrow's velocity was measured at roughly 65 miles per hour. Tafoya then fired multiple arrows at a gel torso in quick succession, landing multiple death strikes, including a shot between two ribs, a shot to the neck that would have severed the spinal cord, and a shot along the jawline that would have jutted into the base of the brain. The edge was given to the bow and arrow due to its superior range, accuracy, and lethality.
For special weapons, the sica was tested against the war club. Steven Dietrich was able to almost cut off a gel arm with the sica, cutting cleanly through skin and muscle tissue to the bone. The war club, wielded by Snake Blocker, was then tested on two targets: a bare skull and a Gladiator's helmet. It completely shattered the skull but was broken against the helmet. The sica was given the edge for its cutting ability and the club's failure.
Both warriors did not bring one of their weapons in the final battle (the Gladiator's scissor and the Apache's horse jaw tomahawk).
The Apache is the first of thirteen warriors to win after scoring more kills at mid range and long range.
The trident and net is the first weapon to be given the edge and score fewer kills than the opposing weapon.
According to the given statistics, the Gladiator had a size advantage of 1 inch and 45 lbs, with heavier gear of up to 28 lbs difference. The Gladiator is the heaviest warrior featured in Season 1.
The Gladiator is the first warrior to have more weapons than his opponent (Gladiator 5, Apache 4).

Reenactment 1

The Apache is seen walking in a grassy field. A Gladiator appears over a hill, the warriors spot one another. The Gladiator makes a battle cry, raises his trident and walks towards the Apache. The Apache pulls out his bow and fires an arrow at the Gladiator, the arrow hits his shield. The Gladiator takes out a sling and hurls a stone at the Apache, who easily dodges it. The Apache fires another arrow at the closing Gladiator and hits him in the side of his stomach. The Gladiator pulls the arrow out and yells in anger, surprising the Apache. The Apache retreats as the Gladiator slings another stone at him. The stone misses, and the Apache fires another arrow before further retreating into the trees. The Gladiator catches up, and takes out his trident and net. The Apache tries to block with his shield, but it is thrown aside by the trident. The Apache pulls out his tomahawk and swings at the Gladiator. The two fight hand to hand, but the Gladiator kicks the Apache to the ground. The Gladiator advances with his trident while the Apache tries to avoid the weapon. The trident gets stuck in a tree branch, but the Gladiator quickly frees it and continues to attack the Apache. With few options left, the Apache tries a run. The Gladiator, however quickly throws his net, tripping and ensnaring the Apache. The Gladiator throws the trident at the Apache, but the Apache barely rolls out of the way in time. He then frees himself from the net and throws a tomahawk, which sails past the Gladiator's helmet. The Gladiator pulls out his sica, and the Apache pulls out his war club. The Gladiator tries to cut the Apache with the sica, but the Apache knocks it out of his hand with the war club. He then swings it again and knocks off the Gladiator's helmet. The Gladiator pulls out his shield and breaks the arrow from earlier off. The Apache then charges at the Gladiator and tries to jump and strike his head with his club. However, the Gladiator hits him with his shield, sending him to the ground. The Gladiator now kneels down and punches him repeatedly in the face with the cestus. He backs up, thinking the Apache is dead, but the Apache draws his knife and scrambles to his feet. The Gladiator tries to punch him with, but misses. In a last desperation, the Gladiator swings his shield at the Apache, but the Apache ducks and slices the Gladiator's hamstrings. He slices across the Gladiator's chest, then gets up stabs him in the back. The Gladiator falls before the Apache slits his throat. The dead Gladiator falls to the ground, but the Apache still stabs him several times to make sure he is dead. The Apache gets up, licks the blood off his knife, lets out a battle cry, and runs away.

Winner: Apache

Episode 2: Viking vs. Samurai
Viking team: Casey Hendershot (Viking Weapons Instructor), Matt Nelson (Viking Combat Expert)
Viking weapons: Great Axe, Long Sword, Spear, Shield
Viking armor: Steel helmet, Chainmail, Wooden Shield

Viking statistics: Height: 5 feet, 11 inches Weight: 180 lbs Gear Weight: 65 lbs

Samurai team: Tetsuro Shigematsu (Samurai Descendant), Brett Chan (Samurai Weapons Expert)
Samurai weapons: Katana, Naginata, Yumi, Kanabo
Samurai armor: Kabuto, Dō-maru

Samurai statistics: Height:5 feet, 3 inches Weight: 135 lbs Gear Weight: 65 lbs

For short-range weapons, the katana was tested against the great axe. The katana was tested first against three tatami bamboo mats (with the same density as human bone), and managed to cut them all in one clean swipe in under a third of a second.  It was tested next on pig carcasses, and managed to cut through two pigs cleanly (severing two consecutive sets of vertebrae). Finally, it was tested against the Viking's chainmail, but failed to do any real damage. The great axe was first tested on a thick, short block of wood, while the weapon's force was measured. The block of wood was easily chopped in two, with the force being measured at 11,000 newtons (roughly 2000 pounds of force). Dr. Armand Dorian theorized that a blow from such a weapon would sever a limb. The great axe was next used on a ballistics gel torso, nearly cleaving the gel dummy in half in a downward chop, visually appearing to reach beyond the heart and lungs with the axe blade. Dr. Dorian compared the injury to a trauma victim who had been run over by a train. However, the great axe bounced off a solid Samurai helmet in the same overhead chop. After viewing the high-speed footage of the test, it was theorized that a person wearing the helmet at the time of the strike would possibly suffer minor head trauma, but little more. The narrow advantage was given to the axe due to its greater killing power.
For mid-range weapons, the long sword was tested against the naginata. The naginata proved itself as a quick ranged weapon by slicing a dummy with several quick cuts, taking off part of the skull and exposing brain matter in one, slashing through the face and jaw and slicing off part of the jawbone in the second, and breaking through a rib and stabbing the heart on the last. The long sword also proved very effective, making a very deep slash across the side of the head and into the brain cavity in its first strike, impaling the neck on the second, and making a final slash across the neck. Geoff Desmoulin theorized that the only thing which kept the gel skull from being directly decapitated by the long sword's strike was the metal supporting rod (which was itself chipped). The edge was given to the long sword due to its killing power.
For long-range weapons, the Viking's spear was tested against the Samurai's yumi bow. The spear was thrown at targets 25 feet away, and penetrated wood targets that were several inches thick. Two spears were also thrown at once, and were capable of the same severity of penetration. The yumi was shot at two dummies from 45 feet, accurately hitting them. The yumi's accuracy was also shown by shooting out dummy eyes at 25 feet. The yumi was given the advantage due to its accuracy and range.
For special weapons, the Viking's shield was tested against the Samurai's kanabo. The Viking's round shield proved itself effective as a defensive shield and as a bludgeoning weapon. A large, 35-pound version of the kanabo was tested and shattered a cow's femur as well as breaking off a part of the shield, although many of the studs in the club were knocked out in the process. The kanabo was measured at 470 psi, and it was theorized that an arm behind the shield would suffer at least one broken bone. In a comparison of killing ability, the kanabo was given the edge.
The Samurai is one of six warriors with no battle cry at the end of the battle.
The Samurai is one of three warriors to get at least 100 kills with each weapon.
The Viking is the first warrior to lose despite having the most effective weapon in the fight – the long sword.
The great axe is the second weapon to be given the edge and to score fewer kills than the opposing weapon.
According to the listed statistics, the Viking had a size advantage of 8 inches and 45 lbs, the largest discrepancy in physical size of Season 1. The Samurai had lighter gear by 5 lbs. The Samurai tied with the Ninja as the lightest warrior featured on Season 1.

Reenactment 2

The battle starts with the Viking walking out into a field. He puts his great axe on the ground as the Samurai appears, holding a naginata and a yumi bow. The Samurai lets out a battle cry, and then fires an arrow at the Viking, which hits the Viking's chain-mail-covered shoulder. The Viking pulls out the arrow and looks up, only to find a second arrow coming at him. It hits him in his helmet, dazing him. The Viking pulls out two spears and charges at the Samurai, hurling them both when he gets close enough. The Samurai attempts to dodge them, but he is struck by one and thrown to the ground. The Viking picks up his great axe and rushes at the Samurai. The Samurai gets up and grabs his naginata. The Viking swings his axe, but is blocked by the naginata. The Samurai twists his naginata and throws the Viking's axe out of his hands. He hits the Viking with the naginata, but the damage is reduced by the Viking's chain mail. The Viking recovers his axe and begins swinging wildly at the Samurai. With a heavy blow, he knocks the naginata out of the Samurai's hands and kicks the Samurai. The Viking swings his axe at the Samurai's back, but the Samurai's armor manages to prevent the axe from tearing into the Samurai. The Samurai pulls out his kanabo club and hits the axe, once again knocking it out of the Viking's hands. He tries to swing at the Viking, but the Viking blocks with his shield as he crouches to the ground. The Samurai begins to savagely hit the shield with his kanabo, and manages to chip off a portion of the shield, injuring the Viking's arm. The Viking yells in pain but then gets up and charges at the Samurai with his shield. He pushes the Samurai all the way to a bridge, and then off it. The Samurai falls into a ditch below, losing his club in the process. The Viking draws his long sword and jumps down. The Samurai manages to get up and pulls out his katana. The two begin to clash swords, with the Samurai getting in blows at the Viking. The Viking swings at the Samurai, but the sword just slides off of his armor. He tries once again but the Samurai moves out of the way, and the Viking crashes into a tree. The Samurai slashes at the Viking's legs, forcing the Viking to his knees. He stabs his katana straight down into the Viking's neck. He then pulls out his sword before the Viking falls to the ground, dead. The Samurai flips the Viking over and readies another stab to his heart, but sees that his opponent is dead. The Samurai sheathes his katana and limps off into the distance.

Winner: Samurai

Episode 3: Spartan vs. Ninja
Spartan team: Jeremy Dunn (Spartan Weapons Expert), Barry Jacobsen (Spartan Historian)
Spartan weapons: Short Sword, Spear, Javelin, Shield
Spartan armor: Bronze Cuirass, Corinthian helmet, Bronze-coated Shield

Spartan statistics: Height: 5 feet, 8 inches Weight: 165 lbs Gear Weight: 60 lbs

Ninja team: Lou Klein (Ninjitsu Master), Michael Lehr (Martial Arts Expert)
Ninja weapons: Ninjato, Black Eggs, Shuriken, Blowgun, Kusarigama
Ninja armor: None

Ninja statistics: Height: 5 feet, 2 inches Weight: 135 lbs Gear Weight: 10 lbs

For short-range weapons, each warrior's sword was tested against ballistics gel torsos. The ninjato was able to cut six inches into the shoulder, lacerating the arm's blood vessels and the lung, and causing death by bleed-out within a matter of seconds. The velocity of the ninjato was measured and while the results were not specifically stated on the show, it was stated that the ninjato's velocity surpassed that of the Spartan's dory spear. The Spartan xiphos short sword was thrust six or seven inches into the torso just below the ribcage, but hit the metal rod supporting the torso with enough force to bend the sword, preventing an accurate reading, but according to Spartan expert Barry Jacobsen, it would have severed a real spinal cord. It was also explained in the Ninja/Spartan episode of the Aftermath that the blow had already severed the main aorta, cause rapid death. Both weapons were also tested on pig carcasses. The ninjato was able to cut clean through the pig in two slices (cutting through the pelvis and the spine) as well as the short sword. The edge was given to the ninjato due to its power, lightness, superior range, and quickness.
For mid-range weapons, the Spartan's spear was tested against the Ninja's black egg. The dory spear was first tested on a dummy while its thrusting force was measured; Geoff Desmoulin claimed that the measured force of the thrust was equivalent to a two-story fall onto the same spear if it were to be held up vertically. The dory was next thrust at a gel torso where it proved to be a devastating blow, breaking ribs, piercing the heart and a lung, and exiting the back. Dr. Armand Dorian claimed that a person struck with such a blow would die within 30 seconds. Black eggs containing both crushed glass and pepper juice were thrown at a Spartan helmet where it was proved to be blindingly effective. The spear got the edge since it could kill the opponent, whereas the egg was only a distraction tactic.
For long-range weapons, neither the shuriken nor the javelin proved itself effective as the shuriken failed to produce more than minor wounds and the javelin proved slow and inaccurate. The javelin penetrated 2.5–3 inches into a ballistics gel torso, striking the pancreas. The shurikens' velocity were clocked at 48–49 mph, with Dr. Armand Dorian claiming that one of the shuriken blows to a stand-in could have broken a rib and pierced a lung. Another Ninja weapon, the blowgun, was also tested, with Dr. Dorian explaining that the weapon's lethality came from a toxin derived from the puffer fish, which can kill within 30 seconds upon entering the bloodstream. While it also failed to show great killing power on its own, its speed and poison darts gave it the edge.
Being a vital part of Spartan combat, the Spartan's aspis shield was tested against the Ninja's kusarigama in special weapons, and proved itself to be a strong defensive advantage as well as able to deal a killing blow. When it was tested on a dummy an edge-strike inflicted 45Gs, enough to cause a depressed skull fracture, brain laceration, leading to almost immediate death and was likened to low-speed collisions or IED explosions. While the blade of the kusarigama was unable to penetrate the bronze cuirass of the Spartan, the ball & chain proved to be able to distract, disarm, and incapacitate the Spartan. Nevertheless, the shield got the edge due to its defense ability and versatility.
The black eggs and the shuriken are the first two weapons to score zero kills in the simulations.
The Spartan is the second of thirteen warriors to win after scoring more kills at mid range and long range.
The blowgun is the third weapon to be given the edge and score fewer kills than the opposing weapon.
According to the listed statistics, the Spartan had a size advantage of 6 inches and 30 lbs. However, the Ninja's gear was 50 lbs lighter. The Ninja is the shortest warrior featured in Season 1, and is tied with the Samurai as the lightest.
The Ninja is the second warrior to have more weapons than his opponent (Ninja 5, Spartan 4).
Reenactment 3

The Spartan stands in a forest with his shield and spear in hand. Above him, the Ninja watches him while hidden in the treetops. He quietly jumps down and sneaks up behind the Spartan. As he gets close, he draws his ninjato. When he gets close enough, he yells, alerting the Spartan and swings his sword. The Spartan quickly blocks the sword with the shield. He turns around and thrusts his spear, but the Ninja rolls away to hide in the thick grass. The Spartan pulls out his javelin and puts it into the ground. He hears the Ninja and turns to see him spinning the ball and chain from his kusarigama. He throws the ball at the Spartan, who blocks with his shield. The Ninja starts to swing his kusarigama again, but the Spartan charges with the dory and misses. The Ninja swings the ball at the Spartan again, but like before, the Spartan blocks with his shield. He swings it around a third time, but at the Spartan's leg. The chain wraps around and trips the Spartan, sending him to the floor. The Spartan sits up and grabs the chain. The Ninja tries to pull the kusarigama away from the Spartan, but the Spartan keeps a firm grip. In a desperate move, the Ninja breaks the chain with the sickle and rushes at the Spartan with it. The Spartan knocks him away with his Shield and then gets back up with his spear and shield. The Spartan tries to stab him with his spear, but the Ninja kicks the shield and runs away. The Spartan chases and catches up to him, trying to thrust his spear again. The Ninja dodges and breaks the spear in half with his sickle. He tries to stab the Spartan with the broken spear, but the Spartan blocks with the Shield. This time, the Spartan swings his shield and sends the Ninja flying back. The Spartan pulls out his short sword and advances towards the Ninja. The Ninja pulls out a black egg and waits for the Spartan to get close. He then jumps in front of the Spartan, kicks the shield, and throws the egg at the Spartan's face. The Spartan blindly swings at the air as the Ninja back flips off the shield and retreats. When the Spartan regains his vision, he sees the Ninja running away and runs after him. The Spartan runs to a deeper part of the forest. He slowly walks through the trees and makes his way to a darker part of the forest. With his javelin at hand, he looks for the Ninja while keeping his shield up. The Ninja pops out from a tree and tries to shoots him with his blowgun. The Spartan blocks the darts and throws his javelin. The javelin goes off target and misses the Ninja, allowing him to run away. He runs back and pulls out some shurikens. He turns around to throw them, only to find that the Spartan has caught up. He quickly throws one, but the shield protects the Spartan as he knocks over the Ninja. The Spartan pulls out his short sword again and swings at the Ninja, but the Ninja dodges. The Ninja jumps onto a tree and prepares to lunge at the Spartan with his sword. However, he hesitates, and the Spartan holds out his sword and impales the Ninja when he jumps. The Spartan smashes him away with his Shield then stabs him again with the short sword. The Spartan yells out "Sparta!" in victory.

Winner: Spartan

Episode 4: Pirate vs. Knight

Pirate team: Michael Triplett (Pirate Weapons Master), David Hernandez (Sword Fighting Instructor)
Pirate weapons: Cutlass, Boarding Axe, Blunderbuss, Flintlock Pistol, Grenado 
Pirate armor: None

Pirate statistics: Height: 5 feet, 10 inches Weight: 170 lbs Gear Weight: 20 lbs. In addition, a chronological date for the Pirate is listed as the year 1715.

Knight team: David Coretti (Army Veteran/Sword Expert), Josh Paugh (Medieval Weapons Expert)
Knight weapons:   Broadsword, Halberd, Crossbow, Morningstar
Knight armor: Plate Armor

Knight statistics: Height: 5 feet, 11 inches Weight: 180 lbs Gear Weight: 70 lbs. In addition, a chronological date for the Knight is given as the year 1423.

This is the only episode in which armor was up against a weapon in an edged category.
For short-range weapons, both swords were tested against pig carcasses which were mounted on ziplines to simulate motion.  The broadsword cleaved its pig in half, while the cutlass almost managed to do the same. The contest was declared a draw with both showing high killing power even though the Knight's steel armor was not shown to be tested.
For mid-range weapons the blunderbuss was tested against the halberd. The blunderbuss, despite a misfire, was able to put a hole through a layer of double plate armor with one of its pellets, but realistically would not have killed the knight. The halberd was a shown to be a deadly and versatile weapon, as it tore of the back of a ballistic gel torso's skull with one strike to the temple with the axe blade (exposing a large amount of brain matter), pierced the abdomen and the throat with the pike end, and tore the skull in half with two more swings of the axe blade. However, because of the blunderbuss' power of penetration, range, and concussion, it was given the edge.
Both long-range weapons were tested on dummies, with the crossbow bolt penetrating deeply into an unprotected dummy, striking 2.5 inches into the torso and striking the upper part of the liver and the pancreas at a speed of 115.8 feet per second, or roughly 78 mph. The flintlock, meanwhile, was able to dent but not penetrate the breastplate on its dummy. Furthermore, Michael Triplett called his shot but missed, indicating inaccuracy in the flintlock. The crossbow took the edge thanks to its killing power, range, and accuracy, and the deficiencies of the flintlock.
For special weapons, the morningstar was tested against the grenado. The morningstar proved to be a fast and deadly short-range weapon when it shattered a dummy skull. An initial swing struck the top of a ballistic gel's torso's skull with the morningstar's chain, shattering the left cheekbone and the jaw. A second strike broke the spinal cord and a third completely shattered the skull, removing all brain matter from the brainpan. The morningstar was registered at 1300 psi—over 17 times the amount of force needed to fracture a human skull. The grenado was detonated near several pig carcasses, one having an armor plate. The grenado produced a great blast, with the shrapnel tearing holes in the unprotected flesh of all three pigs. However, it failed to penetrate the armor at close range. With both weapons effective, the win was given to the grenado for its concussion, shock value, and shrapnel.
The plate armor was tested throughout the show, being effective against most of the Pirate weapons. The boarding axe put a very small hole in a Knight helmet, but did not penetrate it. The boarding axe's strike was measured at 33 psi, but Geoff Desmoulin claimed that the computer measured the section of the helmet just below the section where the axe's pike struck—implying that the actual psi for the strike was likely greater than 33 psi. The edge was given to the armor for its defence power.
This is the first episode to have a tie in weapons edges.
Both warriors did not bring one of their weapons in the final battle (the Pirate's boarding axe and the Knight's halberd.)
This is the first of three episodes to have a warrior with at least one gunpowder-based weapon win over one who does not.
The flintlock pistol is the first (and currently only) gunpowder-based weapon to be outperformed by a non-gunpowder weapon in the same category.
According to the given statistics, the Knight had a size advantage of 1 inch and 10 lbs; roughly equal by the standards of Deadliest Warrior matchups. However, the Knight's gear was 50 lbs heavier.
According to the years listed, the time differential between the two warriors is 292 years. The Knight has the heaviest gear of any warrior featured in Season 1.
The Pirate is the third and last warrior to have more weapons than his opponent (Pirate 5, Knight 4, since the armor wasn't a weapon). He is also the only warrior of the three that also won.

Reenactment 4

The battle begins with a Pirate discovering a dusty treasure chest in the middle of the forest. In the distance, the Knight comes riding in on his horse. The Pirate opens the chest and begins counting the gold doubloons inside, but hears the horse coming towards him. He looks up and sees the Knight with his morning star in hand. Thinking that he is trying to steal his treasure, the Pirate pulls out one of his flintlock pistols. The Knight begins swinging his morning star and signals his horse to charge at the Pirate. The Pirate aims his pistol and fires, but misses the Knight. He pulls out another pistol and fires a second time, but the bullet bounces off of the Knight's armour. The Knight's horse dashes at the Pirate, and the Knight  hits him with his flail, but the Pirate survives. The Pirate lights up a Grenado and throws it as the Knight prepares for another charge, The Grenado hits the Knight's shield but the impact was enough to throw him off his horse. The Pirate cautiously approaches the fallen Knight with two pistols drawn, but the Knight shoots him in the leg with the crossbow and follows up with an attack from the morningstar. Knocked back, the Pirate retaliates with the blunderbuss, sending the Knight tumbling to the ground. Taking advantage of the situation, the Pirate grabs the chest as the Knight pursues him toward a beach. The Pirate fires another pistol at the Knight, and they duel with the longsword and the cutlass. The Pirate gains the high ground by climbing up a boulder and kicks the Knight, sending him tumbling backward. The Pirate follows this up by throwing sand at the Knight's face. The Knight manages to tackle the Pirate but is encumbered by his armor. This gives the Pirate the opportunity to crawl for his pistol, open the Knight's faceplate, and shoot him in the head.

Winner: Pirate

Episode 5: Yakuza vs. Mafia

Yakuza team: Zero Kazama (Yakuza Weapons Expert), David Kono (Yakuza Descendant/Historian)
Yakuza weapons: Nunchakus, Walther P38, Sten Gun, Ceramic Grenade, Sai
Yakuza armor: None

Yakuza statistics: Height: 5 feet, 6 inches Weight: 150 lbs Gear Weight: 10 pounds.
In addition, a chronological date for the Yakuza featured in this episode is given as the year 1947.

Mafia team: Joe Ferrante (Mafia Weapons Expert), Thomas Bonanno (Mafia Descendant/Historian)
Mafia weapons: Baseball Bat, Sawed-Off Shotgun, Tommy Gun, Molotov Cocktail, Ice Pick
Mafia armor: None

Mafia statistics: Height: 5 feet, 10 inches Weight: 170 lbs Gear Weight: 10 pounds. In addition, a chronological date for the episode's Mafia is given as the year 1929.

The nunchakus were tested against the baseball bat. The bat broke a pig's spine at over 100 mph, breaking five segments of the spinal cord. Zero Kazama is then seen delivering a roundhouse kick against another pig apparently breaking the spine though the results are not explained Zero states Nunchaku are distraction weapons. The nunchakus were tested on a gel head and managed to crack its skull in three hits. Joe Ferrante performed an impromptu demonstration of the bat on the same torso and caused more damage in one swing (though this would have been inaccurate because the skull was already broken). In the end, the bat was given the edge for its sheer power.
The Walther P38 was tested against the sawed-off double-barreled shotgun. The P38 proved to have deadly accuracy, managing to hit a synthetic skull (filled with brains) through the left eye socket. The sawed-off shotgun was tested on a dummy, hitting its target in the torso and cheek. The shotgun was given the edge due to its superior killing power.
The Tommy Gun and Sten were both tested against single and multiple targets. The Tommy Gun was given the edge due to its stronger caliber, faster rate of fire, and larger magazine.
The ice pick was tested against the sai. The ice pick was able to stab a gel torso in the neck and through its head. The sai was tested on a blood-filled foam torso, and was able to put multiple stab wounds in it. The sai was given the edge due to its versatility. The ice pick was included as a weapon only because it was commonplace; the sai, however, was actually designed for use as a weapon.
The ceramic grenade was tested against the Molotov cocktail. The ceramic grenade was able to take out three targets: one was confused, one was disoriented, and the other was dead. The Molotov cocktail was tested on two dummies in a car. When thrown, it put the car in a "mini-firestorm" and slowly burned the dummies. The ceramic grenade was given the edge due to its ability to put its victims in a completely defenseless state, whereas the Molotov's victims were not immediately incapacitated.
This was the first ever squad-on-squad battle in the show.
This is the first episode that involves neutral nonparticipants in the simulation: A couple gets caught in the initial crossfire at the start of the fight.
Despite not being tested, in the simulation, the Mafia can be seen with a pistol and stiletto and one of the Yakuza members can be seen with a katana.
The Mafia is one of six warriors with no battle cry at the end of the battle.
The Tommy Gun scored the most kills of any firearm in the first two seasons.
The Mafia are the third warriors of thirteen to win after scoring more kills at mid range and long range.
The sai is the fourth weapon to be given the edge while scoring fewer kills than the opposing weapon.
According to the listed statistics, the Mafia had a size advantage of 4 inches and 20 lbs. Gear weight was equal. The time differential between the two warriors as listed is 18 years. As a side note, this was the third episode of four consecutive episodes to feature warriors of Japanese descent; of these, the Yakuza were both the physically largest and the chronologically most modern.

Reenactment 5

At a Japanese hotel's reception, a couple's filing in for the night, before being ambushed by the Yakuza from one corner...and the Mafia right on the other exit of the hotel. One of the Mafia's members prepares a Molotov Cocktail for a spicy welcoming, but he's cut short by one of the civilians shouting "Bakudan desu!" (That's a bomb!); this causes the Yakuza to retaliate swiftly by shooting rounds of British Sten, but the Mafia doesn't stay behind and shoots from their Tommies as well, killing the civilians, one of which is used as meatshields by the Yakuza's leader. The men hide behind couches, doors, and sofas. Behind the welcoming counter, the same Molotov Gangster prepares another of his cocktails, but a Yakuza member lights up a ceramic grenade and rolls it towards, him, blowing up the Mafia member and setting him on fire at the same time, effectively killing him instantly. As the crossfire goes on, two Yakuza are gunned down by Tommy Gun rounds and another Mafia member is shot down by a Walther, causing the leader to run off. The Yakuza's leader goes for hiding on an elevator shaft, where another Mafia member was hiding, the Yakuza leader brings out his two Sais as the Mafia member brings out his trusty shaving blade. After a brief fight, the Yakuza Leader stabs the Mafia member in the heart, before finishing him off with his Walther. The crossfire continues on the stairways, where a Mafia member mows down a Yakuza member with a shot from his sawed-off Shotgun, before he himself being taken down by the Yakuza's British Sten's near-surgical accuracy. At the basement, the Mafia's leader, the lone remaining member, hides behind some lockers, as the remaining Yakuza member (barring out the leader), prepares to ambush him with his Sten, but the Mafia leader quickly disarms him with a strike from his baseball bat. The Yakuza brings out a pair of nunchaku, but the Mafia leader knocks him down, and proceeds to beat the Yakuza to death. As the Mafia leader heads into the boiler room, he encounters the Yakuza leader, leading to another exchange of rounds, before the Mafia leader has to reload, the Yakuza leader manages to aim his Walther to the Mafia leader's head, but he runs out of ammunition, allowing the Mafia leader to retaliate by bludgeoning him with his shotgun's body. The Yakuza leader quickly brings out his sai, while the Mafia leader brings out his switchblade, what follows is a close match between blades, which includes piercing through one of the boilers, the Mafia leader injures the Yakuza leader in the arm, before forcing him face-first into the hole on the boiler, disorienting him, and leaving him ready for a stab to the neck from the Mafia leader's ice pick, killing the Yakuza leader. With that off the way, the lone mafioso lights up a cigar, content with his victory, and prepares to leave, with another contract under his belt.

Winner: Mafia

Episode 6: Green Berets vs. Spetsnaz

Green Beret team: Matt Anderson (former Green Beret), Sgt. George Gomez (Former Green Beret)
Green Beret weapons: Beretta Pistol, Mossberg Shotgun, M4A1 Carbine, M24 Rifle, M67 Grenade, E-Tool
Green Beret armor: None

Green Beret statistics: Height: 6 feet, 1 inch Weight: 180 lbs Gear Weight: 29 lbs.  In addition, a force size of 4,500 soldiers is given.

Spetsnaz team: Sonny Puzikas (Former Spetsnaz Operative), Maxim Franz (Former Spetsnaz Operative)
Spetsnaz weapons: Makarov Pistol, Saiga Shotgun, AK-74 Carbine, Dragunov Rifle, RGD-5 Grenade, Ballistic Knife
Spetsnaz armor: None

Speztnaz statistics: Height: 5 feet, 11 inches Weight: 175 lbs Gear Weight: 27 lbs. In addition, a force size of 15,000 soldiers is given.

Both pistols were shot at targets while navigating a specially designed target course using a night vision device. The Spetsnaz was able to eliminate all three targets without causing friendly casualties. While the Green Beret was able to navigate the same course in less time (completing the course five seconds sooner than the Spetsnaz) and also without friendly casualties, the Green Beret was only able to kill one target, leaving one target able to fight back in wounded condition and the final target nearly unscathed. The Makarov won due to its shooter's skill despite having a smaller magazine.
The Mossberg was shot at a pig and put four rounds in under four seconds. The Saiga was shot at four targets in under three seconds. The edge was given to the Saiga due to its semi-auto capability.
The AK-74 and M4 were determined to be equal as the users shot all the targets, ending this test as a tie.
The Dragunov and M24 were tested on multiple targets. The Dragunov missed its targets by at least an inch to either side, while the M24 hit all its targets right in the center. The M24 took the advantage due to its greater accuracy.
The ballistic knife went up against the E-tool.  The E-tool was tested on a gel torso and managed to remove the brain, as well as slicing into the intestines, causing them to spill out of the body cavity.  The ballistic knife was tested on three glass orbs and penetrated all three, at a velocity of 15 feet per second, or 39 mph.  In a very close comparison, the ballistic knife was chosen due to its ranged capability and portability.
The RGD5 was detonated inside of a washing machine surrounded by standees and managed to take out one standee and put a piece of the machine in another standee at 40 feet. The M67 was detonated in a clear box with two dummies and a pig, and managed to take them all out. The M67 won due to its larger blast radius.
This is the second episode to have a tie in weapons edges.
Both warriors did not bring one of their weapons in the final battle (neither team brought their sniper rifles and the Spetsnaz did not use their grenades or pistols).
The Spetsnaz leader is tied with Hernán Cortés and Crazy Horse for most humans killed in the battle with four each.
The Green Berets are one of only two United States warriors to face non-United States warriors and lose.
The Green Berets are the second warriors to lose despite having the most effective weapon in the fight, which was the M4-A1 carbine.
According to the given statistics, the Green Berets had a negligible size advantage of 2 inches and 5 lbs, with Spetznaz having an equally negligible advantage in lighter gear at 2 lbs. However, in an unrestrained encounter that went according to the force size statistics listed, Spetznaz would have a numerical advantage of 10,500 soldiers, or a margin of nearly 3 to 1. The Green Berets are the tallest warriors featured on Season 1.

Reenactment 6

The battle begins in the remains of a completely abandoned city. The Spetsnaz squad makes their way to a building blocked by a locked gate. One of the Spetsnaz busts the lock with the butt of his AK-74 carbine and opens the gate to let his fellow soldiers in. Meanwhile, the Green Beret approaches from another part of the city and enters from a different gate. The Green Beret leader carefully walks up to a door and throws his M67 grenade through the broken window. It explodes, causing panic and confusion for the Spetsnaz soldiers inside. He quickly makes his way in and kills the first Spetsnaz man he sees with his M4A1 Carbine. One of his soldiers walks with him into a room, only to be shot by a Spetsnaz and his Saiga shotgun. The leader quickly reacts and kills him with his M4A1. Two other Green Berets enter a hallway, unaware that the Spetsnaz commander and two of his soldiers are nearby. One enters the hallway and gets in a gunfight with one of the Green Berets. The other one sneaks up to the entrance of the room the Spetsnaz soldier is in and throws another grenade inside. The explosion throws the Spetsnaz man out and kills him. The two Green Berets make their way to another room, where they hear another Spetsnaz soldier trying to scare them away with gunfire. One jumps in and kills him with his Mossberg shotgun. Meanwhile, the Spetsnaz leader, now on his own, waits crouched beneath a window while an unaware Green Beret looks for him. When he passes by, the Spetsnaz commander quickly gets up and shoots him with his AK-74. He turns around and kills another Green Beret that was attempting to sneak up on him. He gently kicks the dead soldier to ensure that he was killed, then exits the room. He sees another Green Beret entering the hallway and kills him before he gets a chance to respond. The Green Beret leader enters the hallway just in time to see his last comrade get killed. He tries to shoot the Spetsnaz commander, but the commander manages to run into another room before getting hit. The Green Beret leader enters the room and spots the Spetsnaz leader trying to hide. The Green Beret leader gets an idea and shoots out all the lights in the room with his M4A1, leaving the Spetsnaz leader in the dark. The Green Beret leader puts on his night vision goggles and pulls out his Beretta pistol. The Spetsnaz leader readies his AK-74, but the Green Beret leader fires wildly at him and shoots the gun out of his hands before running out of ammunition. Without a firearm, the Spetsnaz leader tries to escape into the next room. The Green Beret leader takes several more shots, but is unable to hit the Spetsnaz. The Spetsnaz finds himself in a boiler room and a dead end. He turns around to see the Green Beret enter the room with his E-tool held loosely at his side. Both then draw their melee weapons, the Green Beret his E-tool and the Spetsnaz one ballistic knife. The Green Beret begins to frantically swing and manages to knock the knife out of the Spetsnaz's hands. He charges at the Spetsnaz and slams him into a wall. The Spetsnaz leader tries to push him away, but is constantly pushed into walls. He forces the E-Tool up to the Green Beret leader's neck, and the two get into a final struggle. The Green Beret gets the upper hand and knocks the Spetsnaz leader to the floor. The Spetsnaz kicks the Green Beret away, giving himself enough time to pull out a spare ballistic knife tucked away in his boot. The Green Beret prepares to swing his E-Tool, but the Spetsnaz presses a button on the knife. The blade shoots out from the handle and flies into the Green Beret's neck. The Green Beret leader slowly falls to the ground. The Spetsnaz leader gets up and watches the Green Beret leader weakly fidget before lying motionless. He yells "Ya Spetsnaz!" (I am Spetsnaz) and quips "No one will ever defeat us" in Russian to the dead Green Beret before leaving the room.

Winner: Spetsnaz

Episode 7: Shaolin Monk vs. Maori Warrior

Shaolin Monk team: Eric Chen (Kung Fu Master/Historian), Wang Wei (Wushu National Champion), Alfred Hsing (Chinese Weapons Expert)
Shaolin Monk weapons: Emei Piercers, Staff, Twin Hooks, Whip Chain
Shaolin Monk armor: None

Shaolin Monk statistics: Height: 5 feet, 7 inches Weight: 145 lbs Gear Weight: 5 lbs

Maori Warrior team: Seamus Fitzgerald (Maori Weapons Historian), Jared Wihongi (Special Forces Instructor), Sala Baker (Maori Weapons Specialist)
Maori Warrior weapons: Mere, Taiaha, Stingray Spear, Shark Tooth Club
Maori Warrior armor: None

Maori Warrior statistics: Height: 5 feet, 9 inches Weight: 180 lbs Gear Weight: 8 lbs

For the short range match up, the emei piercers were tested against the mere club. The emei piercers showed amazing speed, accuracy, and killing potential as Alfred turned a gel torso's head inside out with repeated stabs (four kill shots in roughly as many seconds). The mere club annihilated a bull skull (which is two times thicker than a human skull) with ease. Dr. Dorian claimed that the strike (which took off the frontal portion of the bull skull) was analogous to a mid-face fracture. The experts of the Maori wanted to prove that the mere was stronger than steel, so they set up a test. Sala tried to smash through a row of bricks with a steel knife and managed to smash through one, but the Mere smashed through three, giving it the edge.
For the first mid-range weapon match up, the twin hooks were put up against the stingray spear. The twin hooks went up first, managing to cut up a pig carcass and cutting cleanly through the ribs. Putting both swords together doubled the weapon's range, a feature it demonstrated while cutting through a gel torso's abdomen to the liver, leaving a deep, geometrically aligned wound which effectively destroyed the abdomen's vital organs. The stingray spear stabbed its opponent, lodging the ends of the spear into the gel torso's abdomen. As this was judged to not be a kill shot, Sala Baker re-aimed with a new stingray spear for the region just below the ribcage. This time, he managed to inflict a kill shot, striking vital organs and possibly striking the spinal cord. The stingray spear caused severe damage, but not as much as the twin hooks, and the twin hooks were given the edge for this and re-usability, as the stingray spear was deemed a "one shot" weapon.
Next the taiaha was tested against the staff. Although the staff managed to take out clay pots with amazing speed and precision (four pots in 2.643 seconds), the taiaha showed more strength by taking out two cow spines (which are three times thicker than a human spine). Earlier, the taiaha was also tested against a pressure sensor, generating over 200 psi of force. The fact that the staff was used more as a defensive weapon was a determining factor in the tests, and the taiaha was given the edge for being designed to kill its target.
In special weapons, the whip chain was tested against the shark tooth club. Although the whip chain showed a lot of killing potential and sharp precision (destroying five glass orbs in two strikes), the shark tooth club was able to not only cut its leg of beef, but kept cutting when the teeth broke off inside the target. The Shark Tooth Club was given the edge.
The Maori Warrior was the first of only three warriors to receive the edge in 3 out of 4 tests (the others being the SWAT team and Vlad the Impaler). The Māori Warrior is also the only warrior so far to lose the match despite having the edge in 3 out of 4 tests.
This is the first episode which does not feature a long range weapons category, as well as the only ancient match in which neither warrior has any kind of projectile, armor, or shield.
Despite not being tested, the Shaolin Monk's meteor hammer was used in the final battle.
The Shaolin Monk is one of six warriors with no battle cry at the end of the battle.
Out of the first two seasons the twin hooks got the most kills, and is the first weapon of the original format that had enough kills to grant the warrior the win alone.
The Shaolin Monk is the first of two warriors with at least one metal weapon to triumph over a warrior who has none.
 According to the listed statistics, the Maori Warrior had a size advantage of 2 inches and 35 lbs, with gear that is only 3 pounds heavier. The Shaolin Monk had the lightest gear of any warrior featured in Season 1.

Reenactment 7

The battle begins with the Shaolin Monk training in a field when he hears someone making loud noises. He investigates and finds the Maori warrior performing his "Ka Mate" haka. The Shaolin monk watches as the Maori dances in front of him. The Maori then sticks his tongue out at him, which means that he is going to eat him. The Shaolin monk slowly walks up to the Maori, which prompts him to raise his stingray spear in defense. The Monk calmly bows to him, but the Maori only responds by charging at him and wildly swinging his spear. The monk swiftly moves and does backflips to dodge the Māori's spear. The Māori sticks his tongue out at the Shaolin again, but the monk remains calm as he pulls out a meteor hammer and begins to swing it around. He tries to bend it around his leg and strike the Māori, but the stingray spear intercepts the blow. The Māori prepares to swing the stingray spear again, but the Shaolin swings the meteor hammer and wraps it around the spear. The two pull on the rope to gain control of the spear. The Māori then angrily throws the spear, causing the monk to fall back. The monk quickly backflips to keep his balance and remain standing. He makes a run for the trees, forcing the Māori to give chase. The Shaolin finds his twin hooks and staff behind a tree and picks them up before resuming his escape. He eventually stops and turns to fight the Māori, who is now armed with his taiaha. He quickly pulls out his whip chain and begins to swing it at the Māori. The Māori blocks the blows before the Shaolin charges at him and swings fiercely. The Māori jumps out of the way and watches the monk drop to the floor. He tries to close in with his taiaha, but the monk swings his whip chain above him and keeps the Māori at bay. Eventually, he bounces his body into the air briefly and swings the chain under him. He wraps it around the Māori's taiaha and pulls at it. The Māori manages to hold on to his weapon, but the distraction allows the monk to get back up. The Māori thrusts his taiaha, but the monk easily slides under it and runs to his staff and twin hooks. The Māori runs after the monk, chasing him to a more open field. Eventually, the Shaolin throws his twin hooks to the ground and springs into a fighting stance with his staff. The Māori watches as the Shaolin begins to twirl his staff around. The two begin to swing their weapon at the other, continuously blocking each other's blows. Eventually, the taiaha breaks the Shaolin's staff. The monk slowly backs up, and the Māori begins to fiercely attack him. The monk tries to dodge the taiaha, but eventually gets hit. The Māori tries to sweep the Shaolin off his feet, but the monk flips into the air and avoids the blow. The monk picks up his twin hooks, and readies himself as the Māori tries to attack again. He effortlessly blocks the taiaha before hooking it and pulling it from the Māori's hands. The Māori tries to come at him, but the monk links the twin hooks together and swings them, cutting into the Māori's stomach. The Māori becomes infuriated and charges at the Shaolin, sending him to the ground. The Shaolin kicks him away and quickly jumps back up. The monk pulls out his emei piercers, and the Māori grabs his shark tooth and mere clubs. The Māori frantically swings at the Monk, who grabs his arm and pulls the mere club from his hand. The Māori swings his shark tooth club and hits the monk. The monk quickly spins one of his emei piercers, distracting the Māori for a second and allowing the monk to punch him in the gut. The monk tries to stab the Māori, but is blocked by the shark tooth club. He spins around and elbows the Māori, causing him to flinch. The monk then grabs both of his emei piercers and stabs him in both the neck and temple. He pulls out his piercers and watches the Māori fall to the ground. The monk bows his head in respect for the dead Māori warrior.Winner: Shaolin MonkEpisode 8: William Wallace vs. Shaka ZuluWilliam Wallace team: Kieron Elliott (Highlander Weapons Expert), Anthony Delongis (Blademaster)William Wallace weapons: War Hammer, Claymore, Ball & Chain, Targe & DirkWilliam Wallace armor: Chainmail, TargeWilliam Wallace statistics: Gear Weight: 40 lbs. William Wallace's height and weight are not listed. Wallace's lifetime of circa 1270–1305 is listed, making him roughly 34–35 years old at the time of his death; he did not die of natural causes, being executed by hanging, drawing and quartering on the order of King Edward I of England.Shaka Zulu team: Earl White (Zulu Stick Fighting Master), Jason Bartley (Zulu Combat Expert)Shaka Zulu weapons: Zulu Axe, Iklwa & Ishlangu, Iwisa, Spit of PoisonShaka Zulu armor: IshlanguShaka Zulu statistics: Gear Weight: Ranges between 7 lbs to 10 lbs. Shaka Zulu's height and weight are not listed. Shaka Zulu's lifetime of 1787–1828 is listed, giving him a lifetime of 40–41 years at death; he did not die of natural causes, being assassinated by his half-brothers.

This is the first battle between two historical individuals to be featured on the show.
For short-range weapons, the war hammer smashed one skull and impaled another in under two seconds. The hammer's pick penetrated four inches into the gel skull, driving through the upper palate of the mouth and still generating enough blunt force to split the skull in half. The zulu axe was used to chop up a leg of beef, being measured at a velocity of 23 mph. The zulu axe was given the edge because of its longer reach and higher speed.
For mid-range weapons, the claymore decapitated three meat heads in one swing (going straight through the joints of the meat necks with precise cuts and lopping the lower jaws off of two of the three skulls), and cleanly cut into a Zulu ishlangu shield and only stopped when it hit the load cell the shield was affixed to. The claymore's strike was measured at 310 psi, with Geoff Desmoulin theorizing that a Zulu warrior behind the ishlangu would suffer at least one broken bone in his arm. The Zulu responded with quick slashes of the iklwa, managing to slice up a pig which was mounted on a zipline to simulate motion. Against the pig carcass, the ilkwa pierced a lung and severed the spinal cord. The ilkwa also managed to penetrate a sample of unriveted chainmail, stabbing into the ballistic gel torso beneath, where it pierced the aorta and stopped an inch before the spinal cord. The range of the claymore and its performance proved to be the deciding factor, giving it the edge.
For long range, the iwisa throwing club was paired against the ball and chain. After missing the target on the first two tries, the ball and chain successfully shattered an ice dummy with enough force to kill a human. The ball and chain struck the ice sculpture in a manner that would have crushed the windpipe and broken the sternum on a person, possibly contusing the heart. A pressure map situated beneath the ice sculpture measured the ball and chain's force at roughly 3200 joules of energy; roughly equivalent to being struck by a motorcycle going at 16 mph. The iwisa, meanwhile, shattered a glass plate and two glass orbs at a velocity of 16 feet per second, or 32 mph. The accuracy, speed, and range of the iwisa earned it the win.
The special weapons test paired the Scottish targe and dirk against the spit poison of the Zulu. The targe and dirk, as a combination, proved deadly. The long spike of the targe was able to puncture a gel torso's heart, and the dirk was capable of stabbing through the torso's brain stem causing paralysis and death. For the spit of poison test, Jason Bartley spat in the face of a test dummy to depict its value as a distraction tactic, but the results were too questionable to give it the win. The targe and dirk were given the edge due to their raw killing power.
This is the shortest simulation run, clocking in at a minute thirty-nine.
The spit of poison is the third weapon to have zero kills.
According to the listed statistics, Shaka Zulu had a considerable advantage in lighter gear, by 30–33 lbs. The size differential between these two warriors is not listed. The time differential between Wallace's execution and Shaka Zulu's birth is 482 years.Reenactment 8The battle begins in a valley with William Wallace armed with his targe and ball & chain. He sees Shaka Zulu running at him and readies his ball & chain. He swings it around and throws it at Shaka, but he rolls right under it. Shaka throws his iwisa at Wallace, who blocks it with his targe, and then pulls out another. Wallace pulls out his war hammer and begins to swings at Shaka. Shaka tries to counter with his iwisa, and the two lock weapons. Wallace thrusts the targe and pierces into Shaka's leg. He pulls out the targe and tries to finish him with the war hammer, but Shaka rolls out of the way. Shaka tries to strike Wallace with his iwisa, but Wallace blocks him again with his targe and knocks the iwisa out of Shaka's hands. Shaka readies his Zulu axe and starts jumping around. Wallace runs at Shaka, who tries to hit him with his axe. Wallace ducks under the axe and blocks with his targe. He swings his war hammer, but Shaka blocks with his ishlangu shield and kicks Wallace away. He pulls out his iklwa and thrusts at Wallace, who dodges and swings his war hammer at Shaka's legs. Shaka falls over and rolls out of the way of Wallace's targe, which has become stuck in the ground. Shaka swings at the targe, preventing Wallace from picking it up. Wallace swings the war hammer, but it gets stuck in Shaka's shield. Wallace pulls the shield from Shaka's hands, throws it and his hammer away. Shaka rolls away and waits with his iklwa and axe in hand for Wallace, who draws his claymore. Wallace swings at Shaka's legs, but Shaka jumps over it. He fails to land properly, however, and instead falls to the ground. Wallace tries to swing at Shaka, but is blocked by his axe. Shaka slashes Wallace's leg with his iklwa, forcing Wallace back. He tries to hit Shaka with his claymore, but Shaka rolls away and dodges. Shaka turns around and tries to run away. Wallace throws his dirk at Shaka, who deflects it with his iklwa. He starts to climb a hill, but stops to ready his spit of poison. He sees Wallace running after him and continues to run up the hill. Shaka tries to spit the poison at Wallace as he approaches, but Wallace turns his head away to prevent it from getting into his eyes. Wallace swings his claymore at Shaka's axe and knocks it out of his hands. Shaka then swings his iklwa and slashes across Wallace's stomach. Wallace swings back in retaliation and slashes Shaka's back. Shaka manages to stab Wallace in his waist, forcing him to stumble back. Shaka charges at Wallace, but he regains his balance at the last second and points his claymore upward. Shaka then jumps at Wallace, effectively impaling himself on the sword. Wallace pulls out his sword and throws Shaka's dead body aside before giving a loud victory cry.Winner: William WallaceEpisode 9: I.R.A. vs. TalibanI.R.A. team: Skoti Collins (I.R.A. Descendant/Historian), Peter Crowe (I.R.A. Weapons Expert)I.R.A. weapons: Slingshot, LPO-50 Flamethrower, AR-15 Armalite, Nail Bomb I.R.A. armor: NoneI.R.A. statistics: Height: 5 feet, 11 inches Weight: 180 lbs Gear Weight: 30 lbsTaliban team: Fahim Fazli (Mujahideen Freedom Fighter), Alex Sami (Counter-Terrorism Specialist)Taliban weapons: Bayonet, RPG-7 Rocket Launcher, AK-47 Assault Rifle, PMN Mine Taliban armor: NoneTaliban statistics: Height: 5 feet, 9 inches Weight: 160 lbs Gear Weight: 30 lbs

For short-range weapons, the Taliban's bayonet proved more deadly than the IRA's slingshot. The slingshot was a very accurate weapon (capable of hitting the eye socket of a skull), and its velocity was clocked at roughly 155 mph, but it did not provide sufficient killing power. The bayonet was declared the winner because it turned the already powerful AK-47 into a short range spear, ripping a reinforced cloth punching bag in half with repeated strikes, and puncturing a gel torso's heart and lung.
For mid-range weapons, the LPO-50 flamethrower was paired against the RPG-7 rocket launcher. The LPO-50 (or rather, since the LPO-50 is banned in the US, a substitute flamethrower) burnt its targets at temperatures of 1500 degrees Fahrenheit. However, the effective range (920 meters), explosion radius, and killing power of the RPG-7 were unquestionable, giving it the edge in mid-range weapons.
For long-range weapons, the IRA's AR-15 was tested against the Taliban's AK-47. The AR-15 was capable of hitting a smaller target, meaning it was more accurate. The AK-47 was the victor of a reliability test involving mud. Geoff decided to take the assault rifles into his own hands to decide. In his test, Geoff liked the AR-15 better, earning it the win.
For special weapons, the IRA's nail bomb was compared to the PMN mine. The nail bomb managed to take out all of its targets by lodging its nails into them. The PMN mine proved to be powerful enough to dismember limbs, but could only kill two of its five targets. The nail bomb was more effective at lethally damaging multiple targets, giving the edge over the PMN mine.
This is the first squad-on-squad battle on the show where a counter to tell how many men are remaining on each side was used.
The Taliban were the only warriors in the final battle to be killed with their own weapons (other than in suicide).  One was killed by friendly fire with the RPG-7, and another was killed with his own bayonet after losing it in a struggle with the IRA leader.
This is the closest match-up of season 1, as well as the closest match-up with the original simulator.
The IRA are the first of two warriors to get the edge in explosive weapons and win (The other is the US Army Rangers).
According to the listed statistics, the IRA had a size advantage of 2 inches and 20 lbs. Gear weight was equal.Reenactment 9The battle starts with five Taliban militia climbing over a small hill leading to an abandoned car lot. They survey the area for potential targets. Meanwhile, an I.R.A. squad is sneaking through the lot, using the cars as cover. The Irish Republican Army leader leads his four men through the lot, but wind up running into the Taliban. Both sides manage to get off one kill with each of their assault rifles, the AK-47 and the AR-15 ArmaLite. Both teams scramble and run off in different directions. A Taliban member runs from an I.R.A. man in between two cars. As the I.R.A. man begins to catch up, he steps on a PMN mine and is killed by the explosion. The Taliban soldier escapes, but runs into an I.R.A. member wielding an LPO-50 Flamethrower. He is set on fire and desperately tries to shoot in random directions, but dies before he can make a hit. Another Taliban member runs up and shoots the flamethrower's gas tank, causing it to explode and kill the I.R.A. soldier. Another I.R.A. man runs in between the cars, but is spotted by a Taliban member. He pulls out his RPG-7 Rocket Launcher and fires a rocket at the I.R.A. man, killing him. The I.R.A. leader slowly enters a run-down trailer, keeping an eye out for the Taliban. He opens a closet door and sees a hand holding an AK-47. He quickly moves to avoid the gunfire, and then pulls out the Taliban boss from the closet. The two get into a fight, with the Taliban boss throwing the I.R.A. leader against the cupboards. Outside, the Taliban member with the rocket launcher sees the two men and prepares another rocket. The I.R.A. leader pushes the Taliban boss against the wall and knocks him to the floor, then looks out the window just in time to see the Taliban member with the RPG-7 pointed right at the trailer. He quickly runs out of the trailer, leaving the Taliban boss inside. The Taliban member outside fires the rocket, unaware that the I.R.A. leader left without the Taliban boss. The Taliban boss gets up and sees the rocket flying towards the trailer, leaving only enough time to scream in terror before the trailer explodes. The other Taliban member pulls a bayonet off his AK-47 and runs after the I.R.A. leader. The I.R.A. leader turns and fires his slingshot, but misses. The Taliban man catches up and tries to stab him, but the I.R.A. leader swings a car door in his face. The two struggle to gain control of the bayonet and the I.R.A. leader gains the upper hand, stabbing the Taliban man in the throat. A final Taliban member rushes in with his own AK-47 and tries to shoot the I.R.A. leader. He picks up an ArmaLite from a fallen I.R.A. man and runs from the Taliban member, trying to shoot him as well. The chase leads to a broken-down bus. The I.R.A. leader runs into the bus and pulls out a nail bomb. He sticks it next to the exit in the back and gets out. As the Taliban member enters the bus, the I.R.A. leader blocks the exit with the Armalite. The Taliban member tries to open the door, but is unable to do so. The I.R.A. leader begins taunting him with the remote and then runs away. The Taliban member sees the bomb and tries harder to open the door. The I.R.A. leader runs to a safe spot, then presses a button on the remote. The bomb begins beeping, then explodes and kills the last Taliban member. The I.R.A. leader raises his fist and yells "Ireland!" in victory.Winner: I.R.A.Back for Blood special
As a transition from season one to season two, a special episode (titled Back for Blood) was aired to pit the winning warriors from season one against one another. It was decided to make a distinction between ancient and modern warriors due to the advent of gunpowder changing the face of warfare.

Ancient match
For the ancient elimination block, the warriors assembled included the Apache, Samurai, Spartan, Shaolin Monk, and William Wallace.  The Shaolin Monk was automatically removed from the running due to being passive and for his lack of armour or effective weapons besides the twin hooks. William Wallace was eliminated due to a lack of formidable long-range weaponry, as well as his easily penetrable chainmail. The Apache was taken out for his lack of armor and armor-penetrating weapons. They decided on the Spartan and Samurai, the team captains of the remaining teams made a return to retest their weapons against different adversaries.Spartan representative: Barry Jacobsen (Spartan Historian)Spartan weapons: Short Sword, Spear, Javelin, ShieldSamurai representative: Tetsuro Shigematsu (Samurai Descendant)Samurai weapons: Katana, Naginata, Yumi, Kanabo

For short-range weapons, the Samurai katana was tested against the Spartan's short sword, the Xiphos. Footage of the tests for both from previous episodes was reviewed.  The edge was given to the katana for slicing through two pigs, while the xiphos did not even go through one. The katana also had a length advantage over the xiphos.
For mid-range weapons, the Samurai's naginata was pitted against a gel torso wearing a Spartan cuirass. The gel torso was mounted on an "attack bot" to simulate an attacking Spartan. The naginata failed to penetrate its target, inflicting a dent on the Spartan cuirass but not even inflicting enough blunt force trauma to break a rib. The same attack bot was then outfitted with a Samurai cuirass and tested against the Spartan's dory spear, which not only failed to penetrate its target, but was also severely bent in the process. The dory spear managed to chip the outermost layer of lacquer on the samurai do, but like the naginata, it failed to generate enough blunt force trauma to break a bone behind the do. Despite this, the weapons were declared even because neither could penetrate their enemy's armor.
For long-range weapons, both teams reviewed the footage of the Spartan's javelin and the Samurai's yumi. The javelin was deemed a weapon used against mass formations instead of a single enemy, while the Yumi had speed, killing power, and accuracy. The Yumi was unanimously (including the Spartan expert) given the edge because of its high speed and lethal accuracy.
For special weapons, the kanabo and the Spartan shield were pitted against each other.  While the kanabo used in the testing did fair structural damage to the Viking shield earlier on in season one, the Spartan shield was too solid for the kanabo to damage and was unharmed except for a few dents. The impact of the kanabo onto the Spartan shield was measured at roughly 425 psi (roughly 50 psi less than it generated against the Viking shield). The Spartan shield was shown to be just as powerful a weapon as ever and therefore given the edge.
Despite being a draw, the Spartan's spear killed more enemy warriors than the Samurai's Naginata.
This is the third episode to have a tie in weapons edges.
According to the statistics listed in their regular season matchups, the Spartan had a significant size advantage of 5 inches and 30 lbs. The Spartan also had gear which was 5 pounds lighter.Ancient Match ReenactmentThe battle begins with the Samurai walking through a forest with his Naginata and Yumi Bow in his hands. As he is walking, the Spartan emerges from behind a giant rock and eyes the Samurai. The Samurai, sensing danger, thrusts his Naginata into the ground and watches the Spartan. The Spartan grunts and holds out his Javelin, ready for battle. The Samurai takes an arrow and fires at the Spartan. The Spartan jumps down from the rock and towards the Samurai, knocking the arrow away with his Spartan Shield. He throws the Javelin at the Samurai, but aims too high and misses completely. The Samurai readies another arrow while the Spartan pulls out his Spear and charges at the Samurai. At the last second, the Samurai aims for the Spartan's legs and shoots, but it goes in between them and hits the floor. The Spartan tries to hit the Samurai with his Spear, but the Samurai dodges and picks up his Naginata. The two begin swinging at each other until the Samurai hits his shield. The Spartan uses the Shield as a wall and shoves the Samurai all the way up to a tree. The Samurai tries to stab the Spartan with the Naginata, but the Spartan parries with his Spear and breaks the Naginata in two with his Shield. The Samurai, undeterred, grabs the Spartan's Spear and flips over the Spartan, causing him to release the Spear. The Samurai throws it away and pulls out his Kanabo club. He starts to viciously swing at the Spartan, but the Spartan uses his shield to cover his body and block the blows. The Samurai stops briefly to regain his strength, but the Spartan draws his Short Sword and stabs the Samurai's ear. The Samurai shrieks in pain, backs away and checks his ear for blood. Meanwhile, the Spartan, now very angry, gets back up and starts advancing towards the Samurai. The two stop in the middle of a field while the Samurai grabs a hold of the handle of his Katana. The Spartan makes his move first and thrusts the Short Sword at the Samurai, but the Samurai dodges and swings his Katana. The Spartan, however, blocks it with his Shield and shoves the Samurai away. The two stand off again, and the Spartan once again tries to stab the Samurai. The Samurai avoids it and again tries to hit the Spartan, but the Spartan blocks and hits the Samurai with his Shield. The Samurai gets up and readies himself and his Katana. The Samurai makes a quick thrust at the Spartan in an attempt to finish him off. The Spartan, however, effortlessly blocks again with the Shield and thrusts his Short Sword. It cuts into the Samurai's stomach and leaves him frozen in place. The Spartan swings the Shield into the Samurai's face and knocks him to the ground. The Spartan walks up to him and thrusts the Short Sword into the Samurai's neck, killing him. He pulls out the sword and watches as blood spurts from the Samurai's neck. He raises his Short Sword in the air and roars in victory.Ancient Winner: SpartanModern match
The modern elimination block included the Pirate, Mafia, Spetznaz, and IRA.  The Pirate was automatically eliminated due to his weapons being deemed too "primitive" in comparison to his modern counterparts.  The Mafia was eliminated from contention due to the group not being "professionals," as well as much of their weaponry being improvised.  The Spetsnaz were chosen hands down as the most disciplined warrior of the modern era, while the IRA was deemed the most "unpredictable" of the group.  Due to the weapon disadvantage, two more IRA weapons were tested to pair up against two existing Spetznaz weapons.I.R.A. representative: Skoti Collins (I.R.A. Descendant/Historian)I.R.A. weapons: Webley Revolver, LPO-50 Flamethrower, AR-15 Armalite, HK G3 Sniper Rifle, Nail Bomb, SlingshotSpetsnaz representative: Sonny Puzikas (Former Spetsnaz Operative)Spetsnaz weapons: Makarov Pistol, Saiga Shotgun, AK-74 Carbine, Dragunov Rifle, RGD-5 Grenade, Ballistic Knife

For short-range weapons, the Makarov was pitted against the IRA's sidearm, the Webley Revolver.  Despite the Webley being a more powerful pistol, the Makarov was given the advantage due to the pistol carrying more ammo than the six bullets in the Webley and can be reloaded faster.
For mid-range weaponry, footage for season one reviewed the IRA's LPO-50 Flamethrower against the Spetsnaz's Saiga Shotgun.  While the Saiga was quick and deadly, the LPO-50 Flamethrower brought a psychological advantage. Additionally, burn injuries were deemed to be far worse than gunshot wounds, giving the IRA the edge.
For long range automatic rifles, the footage of season one was reviewed for the AR-15 Armalite and AK-74 Carbine.  It was agreed that the Armalite was the more accurate weapon, but the AK-74 was the more durable weapon; hence, the result was a draw.
For long-range sniper rifles, the IRA's HK G3 was paired against the Dragunov. While both weapons had high kill ratios, the Dragonov was deemed faster and more accurate in terms of execution and given the edge.
For special weapons, season one footage reviewed the IRA's sling shot and Spetsnaz's ballistic knife.  The ballistic knife was determined as having the advantage due to the weapon's killing power.
For explosives, the nail bomb and RGD-5 Grenade were reviewed from the season one footage.  While the RGD-5 was powerful at a wide range, the Nail Bomb (despite being an improvised weapon) was given the advantage due to the high killing power of its shrapnel.
This battle is the most lop-sided match in Deadliest Warrior history with a difference of 472 kills.
This is the fourth episode to have a tie in weapons edges and is also the only episode with the original simulator to have a warrior with kills in the 700s.
This is the first episode where only one side didn't bring one of their weapons in the final battle.(The IRA did not use the slingshot)
The Spetsnaz is the fourth of thirteen warriors to win after scoring more kills at mid range and long range.
The LPO-50 Flamethrower is the fourth weapon to be given the edge while scoring fewer kills than the opposing weapon.
According to the information listed in their regular season matchups, the IRA had a negligible weight advantage of 5 lbs, with heights being equal. While the statistics list Spetznaz as having lighter gear by 3 pounds, this was most likely increased by the extra weaponry given to the IRA for this episode. No force size statistic was given for the IRA.Modern Match ReenactmentThe battle begins with 5 Spetsnaz soldiers infiltrating a warehouse serving as the IRA's headquarters. On top of the building, an IRA member spots them and takes aim with his HK G3 Sniper Rifle. A single shot downs one of the Spetsnaz. Inside the warehouse, an IRA member constructing a nail bomb hears the gunshot and realizes that there are intruders. The IRA sniper aims at another Spetsnaz soldier and fires, but he runs behind a tree and avoids the shot. The 4 IRA members inside start to load up on weaponry for their battle and look for cover for when the Spetsnaz team arrives. The IRA sniper tries to shoot the Spetsnaz man behind the tree, but misses again. Another Spetsnaz man lies on the ground and sets up his Dragunov sniper rifle. He carefully takes aim and shoots, killing the gunman above and knocking him off the rooftop. He gets up and signals for the rest of his team to continue into the building. One Spetsnaz opens the door and is met with gunfire from two AR-15 Armalites. He fires back with his AK-74 carbine and ducks for cover behind drum barrels. Another Spetsnaz soldier tries to assist him from the entrance with his rifle, resulting in a massive gunfight. The Spetsnaz man behind the barrels shoots up, breaking off some rubble which almost hits an IRA man. He tries to shoot back, but his Armalite winds up malfunctioning and is rendered useless. Now without a gun, he calls for the other IRA man with him and tells him to make a run for it. The Spetsnaz soldier behind the barrel calls for his team to run after the IRA. The two IRA men try to run away from the Spetsnaz, but one of the Spetsnaz men throws an RGD-5 grenade at them. It blows up and kills one of them, but the other manages to escape the explosion. Two Spetsnaz soldiers run after the other IRA person, not realizing that they are passing by an armed nail bomb. They stop to shoot at him, with the bomb right behind them. The IRA man is hit, but stays on his feet. He pulls out his remote and presses the button, detonating the bomb and killing one of the Spetsnaz soldiers. The other one gets up and continues chasing the IRA man, following his blood trail. He enters another building and keeps his AK-74 up and ready. As he turns a corner, the IRA man jumps out and knocks the gun out of the Spetsnaz's hands and throws him against a pillar. The IRA man tries to punch him in the face, but the Spetsnaz soldier elbows him in the side, flips sides with him, and starts to choke him. He then throws the IRA man to the floor and pulls out his Ballistic Knife. The Spetsnaz man tries to stab him with it, but the IRA man grabs his arm and tries to push it away. He is overpowered by the Spetsnaz, however, and is stabbed in the face. The Spetsnaz man gets up, only to see a giant stream of fire shoot from the corner. He starts to back away as another IRA member comes in with his LPO-50 Flamethrower at full power. The Spetsnaz soldier tries to run away and enters a room, only to find that it is a dead end. The IRA man shows up at the entrance and sets fire to the entire room, burning the Spetsnaz soldier to a crisp as he screams in agony and pain. He nods in satisfaction and turns around, only to find himself staring down the barrel of another Spetsnaz's Saiga shotgun. Terrified, the IRA man tries to bring his flamethrower around to fire, but the Spetsnaz soldier fires and completely blows off the IRA man's head. The Spetsnaz soldier makes his way to the bathroom and cautiously opens the door. Believing that the room is empty, he slowly starts to enter with the Spetsnaz leader following behind. Suddenly, the last IRA member jumps out and kills the Spetsnaz leader's last soldier with the Webley revolver. The Spetsnaz leader tries to shoot him with his Makarov pistol, but misses. The IRA member takes cover and fires at the Spetsnaz commander, but misses as well. He runs over to the toilets, dodging the Spetsnaz leader's gunfire. He takes aim and tries to fire again. However, the gun clicks, indicating that his revolver is out of ammo. The Spetsnaz leader sees this and starts to charge at him. The IRA member desperately tries to get another shot out of his gun, but the Spetsnaz leader quickly runs up to him. He grabs the IRA member and shoves the Makarov up to his throat. He fires the gun, and blood sprays onto the wall as the IRA member slumps onto the toilet seat. The Spetsnaz leader yells out "Ya Spetsnaz!" ("I am Spetsnaz") in victory.Modern winner: SpetsnazSeason 2
Season 2 was announced by the Team and by Spike, along with a video game. A teaser image posted on Twitter shows a Ballistic Gel torso behind a podium. A teaser video was posted for Deadliest Warrior for the people who signed up for Warrior Den with some of the weapons for season 2. The weapons trailer only showed modern weapons. Season 2 premiered April 20, 2010, at 10 pm ET.

Episode 10: SWAT vs. GSG 9SWAT team: Jon Darrah (9 Year SWAT Veteran), Steve Gordon (Metro SWAT Operator)SWAT weapons: Benelli M4 Shotgun, LWRC PSD Rifle, Remington 700 Sniper Rifle, Taser ShockwaveSWAT armor: Kevlar Vest, Combat HelmetGSG 9 team: Michael Nagel (Former German Infantry), Damien Puckler (GSG 9 Combat Instructor)GSG 9 weapons: Remington 870 Shotgun, HK G36, HK PSG1 Sniper Rifle, Stingball GrenadeGSG 9 armor: Kevlar Vest, Gefechtshelm Schuberth B826 Helmet

For Short Range weapons, the GSG9 team used the Remington 870, a pump shotgun with a slower cycle than the SWAT's semiautomatic Benelli M4 Super 90.  In the first test, the SWAT team destroyed its six targets in less time. In the second test, the GSG9 was far more devastating and accurate, destroying the target's head in 17.35 seconds. The Benelli was also accurate, delivering a kill in every shot, and making it in 11.25 seconds.  Finishing their target during both tests in less time gave the advantage to the SWAT team's Benelli.
For Mid Range weapons, each team ran a simulation: rescue a hostage from three enemies, while securing three bystanders. The GSG9 experts, armed with the HK G36 Assault rifle, completed their simulation in 1 minute and 27 seconds. The SWAT team completed the course in 1 minute and 20 seconds. The SWAT's LWRC-PSD utilized higher caliber bullets, and therefore killed with much more damage in less time; earning it the advantage in middle-ranged weapons.
For Long Range weapons, the SWAT team's Remington 700 destroyed the skull of its target by shooting it through the left eye. The GSG9's HK PSG1, however, was able to kill its target by shooting it through the right eye; saving the hostage from kidnapping and being spattered in blood. In addition, the PSG1 was more accurate in hitting its target by about 1/8 of a centimeter, so it earned the advantage in long-ranged weapons.
For special weapons, the GSG9 stingball grenade was tested in a room with test figures, but hit only one of its targets. The SWAT team's Taser shockwave is a weapon composed of 36 Tasers mounted together. At 25 feet, it managed hit all five of its targets while only deploying half of its arsenal. During a test of a single Taser, it was able to bring down its live target non-violently. Therefore, the Taser won the special weapons advantage. The Taser was the first and, to date, only weapon on Deadliest Warrior to be tested on a living subject.
This is the first squad on squad battle that featured four on four instead of the traditional five on five.
This is the first match which does not have melee weapons.
SWAT is one of only three warriors to receive the edge in 3 out of 4 weapons match-ups (the Māori Warrior and Vlad the Impaler being the others).
SWAT is one of six warriors with no battle cry at the end.
SWAT is the fifth of fourteen warriors to win after scoring more kills at mid range and long range.
The SWAT leader has claimed the most human kills in a four-on-four squad match, with three kills.
The HK PSG1 and the Benelli M4 Super 90 are the fifth and sixth weapons to be given the edge and score fewer kills than the opposing weapons.
True to their billing as non-lethal weapons, neither the stingball grenade nor the Taser shockwave scored any kills in the simulation (although the Taser has been reported to unintentionally cause fatalities).  They are the fourth and fifth weapons not to score kills.Reenactment 10The battle begins with the SWAT team's armored van parking near a series of abandoned buildings and parked cars. The squad's captain looks into his binoculars and sees 4 GSG9 members approaching from the other side of the area. The SWAT team splits up, with 3 of the members going off in different directions and the leader setting himself down to set up his Remington 700 sniper rifle. The GSG9 also split up, with each team going into different buildings. In one building, a member of the SWAT team sets up his taser shockwave and hides in another room. A GSG9 member enters the same warehouse, gun in hand. The SWAT team member watches as the GSG9 member slowly crosses the room, then pushes a button on his remote. The taser shockwave shoots out hooks that latch on to the GSG9 member and electrocutes him. A nearby GSG9 hears the commotion and runs in to find his teammate dazed and on the floor. He sees the cord connecting the taser to the remote control and follows it to the next room. The SWAT member tries to shoot the GSG9 man with his LWRC PSD, but misses and is shot himself with the HK G36. The GSG9 member then proceeds to remove the taser hooks from his teammate. The two exit the building, deciding on which building to enter next. The SWAT team captain sees them and shoots one with the sniper rifle, causing the other to flee. He runs up to the roof of a building, sets up his HK PSG1 sniper rifle, and begins to search for a SWAT team member to shoot at. Down below, a SWAT team member is chased into a building by two GSG9 members. The two GSG9 members approach the building, where the SWAT team member tries to shoot them from inside with his Benelli M4 shotgun. One of them tries to fire back with his Remington 870 shotgun, but misses. He pulls out a Stingball Grenade and throws it into the room. It explodes right next to the SWAT member, throwing him to the floor. The GSG9 member then quickly runs in and dispatches him. He enters the next room and finds an exit, only to be shot by a SWAT member and his LWRC PSD. The GSG9 member on the roof sees this and shoots him with his sniper rifle. However, he is spotted by the SWAT team captain and is picked off by the SWAT's sniper rifle. The SWAT team captain then gets up and runs for cover, with the last GSG9 member not too far behind. He hides on the hill behind the SWAT van, slowly approaching it with his Remington 870 shotgun. He opens it from the back, only to find it empty. The SWAT captain, hiding in a parked 4X4 steps out with his Benelli M4. The GSG9 member turns around and tries to fire his gun, but the SWAT team captain shoots first and kills him. The SWAT captain slowly approaches the GSG9 member to make sure he is dead, then turns and removes his goggles.Winner: SWATEpisode 11: Attila the Hun vs. Alexander the GreatAttila the Hun team: Robert Borsos (Mounted Weapon Specialist), Sean Pennington (Ancient Combat Specialist)Attila the Hun weapons: Sword of Mars, Lasso, Hunnic Composite Bow, Scythian AxeAttila the Hun armor: Leather Lamellar, Leather shieldAlexander the Great team: Peter Van Rossum (Sword & Shield Champion), Kendall Wells (Bladed Weapon Specialist), Rashad Evans (Former UFC Champion)Alexander the Great weapons: Kopis, Xyston, Gastraphetes, BallistaAlexander the Great armor: Bronze Cuirass, Chalcidian Helmet, Bronze Shield

 This episode marked the first time combat on horseback was factored into a warrior's combat skills and effectiveness.
For Short-Range weapons, Attila's Sword of Mars went up against Alexander's kopis. When both were tested on horseback (on both stationary and moving targets), the Sword of Mars dealt four killing blows in 34.5 seconds. With the head targets, the Sword of Mars caused a decapitation on one meat "neck" and cut through the cervical muscles to the spinal cord on the other. On the slabs of cattle meat, the Sword of Mars managed to slice four inches through the ribs(which are two to three times thicker than human ribs), causing two death blows. The kopis completed the test in 25.75 seconds; the kopis decapitated one meat "neck" and cut through the spinal cord on the other. However, the kopis failed to penetrate the cattle ribs, and would have inflicted collapsed lungs on a human and possibly scored instant kills, but Dr. Dorian could not say for sure that the wounds would have been instantly fatal. The Sword of Mars received the edge due to killing power.
For Mid-Range weapons, Attila's lasso took on Alexander's xyston lance. The xyston was tested against a pig carcass on a zip-line to simulate the weapon's use on horseback. The xyston impaled the pig at 10 feet/second with almost no resistance. The xyston was also tested from horseback on an armoured carcass and was able to puncture through the front plate, impale the carcass through the sternum, and still puncture the back plate. The lasso could deliver enough force to the victim's neck to cause a hangman's fracture of the neck and crush the trachea, but was determined to not be a certain kill. The edge was given to the Xyston due to its raw killing power.
For Long-Range weapons, Attila's Hunnic composite bow was put up against Alexander's gastraphetes belly-bow. Both were tested on two moving targets. The composite bow was used from horseback, and demonstrated both speed and accuracy. The gastraphetes was tested on foot and could not match the speed or the accuracy of the composite bow, despite the gastraphetes' superior power and target penetration. After this test, the hosts gave the edge to the composite bow.
For Special Weapons, Alexander's ballista was tested against Attila's scythian axe. The ballista was fired at a silhouette target of a mounted Hun at 200 yards, and hit its target at 198 mph. The ballista was also tested against a formation of enemies, and caused instant kills by impaling them. The scythian axe was tested against an unprotected ballistic gel head, tearing the back of the skull completely open, decapitating the skull, and severing the spinal cord with multiple strikes. The velocity of the Scythian Axe was measured at 69 mph.  However, the axe failed to penetrate Alexander's iron helmet, and could only strike the helmet with roughly 20 pounds of force per square inch; 89 pounds per square inch being the minimum amount of force required to inflict a lethal skull fracture. The edge went to the ballista because of its range, killing power, and the Scythian Axe's failure.
 The Greek sport of Pankration was also tested by the Alexander team. Rashad Evans was able to easily crush the trachea and fracture the skull of a ballistic gel torso with only his elbow and knee, respectively.
 This is the first episode to feature multiple warriors on each team in an ancient match, and the only one where a member of the losing team is not known to be killed (Attila and his men were not seen killing one of Alexander's soldiers, so either he escaped or was simply not seen dying).
Attila's Hunnic composite bow scored the most kills of any pre-gunpowder projectile weapon of the first two seasons.
The sword of Mars and the ballista are the seventh and eight weapons to be given the edge and score fewer kills than the opposing weapons.Reenactment 11The battle begins with two of Alexander's men (with the warrior-king himself behind on horseback) pushing a ballista towards a ruined city. Inside the city, Attila and two men sit, eating a meal. As the Macedonian soldiers crank the ballista, birds fly off, warning the Huns of something wrong. Given the order, the Macedonians load and fire the ballista. The bolt sails into a Hun who had just risen to investigate and ironically, walking directly into it. Attila and his men get up and watch as Alexander (holding a Xyston) and his two men (one with a belly-bow, the other a Kopis) run down the small hill toward them. Aided by his other man, Attila mounts his horse, takes up a bow, and rides back a few feet. The belly-bowman arrives first, quickly pulling the string up, but Attila's man fires his own composite bow, killing him. Alexander moves to the Hun, charging at him with his Xyston. Attila draws his bow and fires at Alexander, but the bronze cuirass shatters the arrow. Alexander rides by Attila's bowman, impaling him with the Xyston and giving a shout of satisfaction. Attila rides in with a lasso and tries to throw it around the neck of his foe, but Alexander catches it. He pulls Attila off his horse and after a struggle, Attila does the same to him. The Great runs over to his fallen bowman and grabs his shield. Attila, Scythian axe and shield in hand, bounds toward him. Clashing, Alexander knocks Attila's shield from his hands with a Kopis. Attila falls back, but when Alexander comes up and thrusts at The Hun, Attila sucks his stomach in, avoiding the sword. Turning to the pick side of the axe, Attila gives a mighty swing and punctures a hole through the bronze shield. Alexander discards the shield as Attila draws the Sword of Mars. They cross blades, with Attila cutting Alexander's right arm. Attila charges Alexander who has dropped his Kopis but catches the Hun, and throws him to the ground. The two start fighting with their bare hands, until Alexander throws Attila onto the floor. Attila spots his sword on the floor and scrambles to retrieve his sword. Alexander grabs Attila's leg and tries to pull him away from the sword, but Attila kicks Alexander in the face. He tries once again to grab his sword and succeeds. Alexander approaches Attila and is promptly stabbed through the neck. Attila thrusts his sword in the air and yells in victory.Winner: Attila the HunEpisode 12: Jesse James vs. Al CaponeJesse James team: Joey Dillon (Champion Gunslinger), J.W. Wiseman (Sharpshooting Expert)Jesse James weapons: Bowie Knife, Colt Revolvers, Winchester Rifle, Pistol WhipJesse James armor: NoneAl Capone team: Meyer Lansky II (Mafioso Descendant), Johnny Lew Fratto (Capone Authority)Al Capone weapons: Stiletto, Tommy Gun, Pineapple Bomb, Brass KnucklesAl Capone armor: None

This was the first modern fight with individual warriors and their men.
For short-range weapons, Al Capone's stiletto knife was tested against Jesse James' bowie knife. The Stiletto was used to give a ballistics gel torso a "rat's smile", cut through the carotid artery and the windpipe, stab through the stomach and pierce the lower intestine, and stab between the ribs and into the heart. The stiletto's impact speed was measured at 16.5 feet per second. The bowie knife was capable of disemboweling a pig carcass; cutting through ribs and exposing the kidneys as well as being able to be thrown. While the impact speed of the bowie knife was also measured, the results were not revealed on the show. Even though the bowie knife caused more damage, the stiletto knife was given the edge because of its concealability and speed.
For mid-range weapons, Jesse James' Colt pistols were tested in a recreation of a 19th-century bank, where they expended 12 rounds and made three multiple-hit kills in under seven seconds, with a drawing time of one quarter second. Among the recorded kills was a bullet wound through the cheekbone and brain stem, and a bullet wound which severed the left ventricle. Al Capone's Thompson sub-machine gun was tested on three targets as well. It expended 50 rounds and shot all three targets in six seconds with two kill shots and a mortal liver wound. The Colt pistols were also tested on horseback and the Thompson in a 1929 Hudson Super 6 simulating the vehicles of the each warrior's time. The Colt pistols shot three of the five targets, two kill shots and a disarming arm wound. The Thompson was tested in the Hudson with identical results. The edge was given to the Thompson due to its ability to put more rounds into its targets.
For long-range weapons, Al Capone's Mk 2 "Pineapple" Grenade was tested against Jesse James' Winchester rifle. Both the pressure wave and fragmentation of the grenade were devastating, but the grenade only killed three of its four targets, and had the added disadvantage of a five-second fuse. The Winchester rifle was able to kill all four of its targets in less time than the grenade. The edge was given to the Winchester because of its greater speed, range, and accuracy.
For special weapons, Al Capone's brass knuckles were tested against Jesse James' pistol whip. The brass knuckles were shown to double the force of a punch from 41 psi to 75 psi. The brass knuckles also managed to fracture a naked skull with one hit and cause a depressed skull fracture in three hits. The pistol whip took only one strike to break through a naked skull with a force of 182 psi (more than double that of the brass knuckles). For this reason, the edge was given to the pistol whip.
This is the first match-up that features warriors of the same nationality (American).
This is the first episode where one weapon is used in two different categories, as well as an attack being listed as a weapon (Jesse James' revolvers were used to shoot and bludgeon).
This is the first episode that each of the warrior squads talk in the second season.
This is the second squad on squad battle that featured four on four instead of the traditional five on five.
This is the first battle where a small beep accompanies the counter, indicating that a warrior is dead.
Al Capone is the third warrior to lose despite having the most effective weapon in the fight, which was the Tommy Gun.
The stiletto is the ninth weapon to be given the edge and score fewer kills than the opposing weapon.
This is the only episode with two survivors on the winning team in the fight scene, as well as the only episode where one of the primary named warriors did not deal the finishing blow.Reenactment 12The battle begins in an American history museum in Chicago hosting an exhibit about Old West outlaws. Inside, Jesse James, his brother Frank James, and two other gang members are in the Civil War exhibit, breaking the glass exhibits and arming themselves with Colt revolvers and looting some of the Civil War coins. Meanwhile, Al Capone and three of his men drive up to the museum, alerting the James Gang who have finished loading up their newly acquired revolvers. Suspecting intruders, Jesse, Frank, and the gangmen take up positions, ready to fight. The Capone Gang enter and, while marveling the exhibit, are suddenly ambushed by the James Gang. Jesse's team score the first kill in the quick draw showdown. A hailstorm of bullets ensues as both factions open fire on each other, with a Capone flunky taking out one of Jesse's men out with a Tommy gun. Amidst the gunfire, Jesse James's other henchman steals a Winchester rifle from one of the cabinets and lays down some suppressing fire while Jesse and Frank retreat further into the museum. Al Capone's men come out of cover and begin chasing them, with Capone dusting off his hat and following close behind. Jesse's rifleman stops in a hallway and cocks the Winchester, shooting one of Capone's two remaining men as he rounds the corner. Frustrated, Capone's other henchman tries to shoot down the outlaw, fruitlessly firing in all directions. The man then turns and shouts,"Boss, let's go!". Capone catches up and the two men begin to run after Jesse James's crew. The third man struggles to catch up, but is stabbed from behind by Frank, who emerges from a dark closet with the Bowie knife. In an office, Jesse and his gunman hear Capone coming, and the gang member tells Jesse to run while he holds them off. Capone and his last cohort enter the office, where Jesse and his henchman are waiting for them. Jesse shoots Capone's man with the revolver, catching him off guard. Capone quickly ducks for cover behind a desk right before the rifleman finishes the last man on Capone's team with a shot from the Winchester. The rifleman waits for Capone to make his move, unaware that Capone is pulling the pin from his MK2 "Pineapple" Grenade. He hurls the grenade over the desk and quickly hides again. The rifleman attempts to shoot Capone, but is killed by the explosion of the Pineapple Grenade before he gets a chance. Capone gets up and tries to steal one of the revolvers, but Jesse James shoots it out of Capone's hand. Realizing he has been beat, Capone slowly stands up with his hands in the air. Jesse James sneers as he pulls the triggers on his revolvers, only to find that both of his guns are out of bullets. Jesse quickly flees while the infuriated Capone pulls off his trench coat and gloves and puts on a pair brass knuckles, intent on killing Jesse. Jesse runs for his life, but is cornered when he winds up at an exhibit for a western jail cell. He turns around to see that Capone has caught up. He tries to pistol whip Capone, but Capone blocks the swing and counters with a punch in the gut with the brass knuckles. Removing his hat, Capone forces Jesse into the mock jail cell and begins to brutally beat Jesse. After kicking James to the floor, Capone draws his Stiletto while Jesse gets up with his Bowie knife at hand. Al goes in for a thrust, but Jesse hooks his hand with the stock of the revolver and stabs Capone at his arm. Enraged, Capone then kicks James as he drops his stiletto, forcing Jesse to also drop his knife. Capone grabs James and continues to attack him with the knuckles. He slams him face first into the bars. Jesse smiles, apparently having seen something Capone didn't.  Capone turns James around and knocks him down with another punch. Right as Capone is about to deliver the killing blow, he hears a gun cock. He looks up to see Frank James with a Winchester. Frank fires the gun, hitting Capone dead center between the eyes. Jesse James dusts off his hat and shouts "Yee-ha!" in victory as Frank smiles. The two brothers hug each other and then run off to steal whatever they can from the museum.Winner: Jesse James GangEpisode 13: Aztec Jaguar vs. Zande WarriorAztec Jaguar team: David Lavera (Aztec Descendant/Martial Artist), Éder Saúl López (Aztec Combat Historian)Aztec Jaguar weapons: Tecpatl, Maquahuitl, Tlacochtli & Atlatl, TematlatlAztec Jaguar armor: Wooden helmet, Ichcahuipilli tunic, Jaguar skin, Chimalli shieldZande Warrior team: Coley Mustafa Speaks (Zande Combat Specialist), Gordon Jock (Zande Weapons Expert)Zande Warrior weapons: Makraka, Makrigga, Kpinga, Botto & Pima Zande Warrior armor: Kube shield

For short-range weapons, the Zande Warrior's makraka took the edge over the Aztec Jaguar's tecpatl sacrificial knife.  In the test, both weapons were demonstrated as execution weapons.  First, the tecpatl demonstrated human sacrifice rituals when the victim's  heart was removed; meanwhile, the makraka was used for beheading a bound prisoner.  The makraka's precision while beheading the ballistics dummy gave it the edge.
For mid-range weapons, the Aztec Jaguar's maquahuitl took the edge over the Zande Warrior's makrigga.  The maquahuitl was tested on a ballistic gel horse head, in which the head was sawed off using three strikes. It is pointed out that the maquahuitl inflicted tearing wounds as opposed to cutting wounds, with the former causing greater bleed-out. Shards of obsidian were embedded in the gel, indicating the weapon would cause more damage if it hit.  For the makrigga, the weapon was tested on a 300-pound piece of beef filled with animal blood and entrails. The weapon went through the beef, and with the weapon's spiked barbs, pulled out entrails when it was pulled out. The maquahuitl, nicknamed "the obsidian chainsaw" by Geiger, was given the edge due to its greater destructive power.
For long-range weapons, the Zande Warrior's kpinga took the edge over the Aztec Jaguar's atlatl and tlacochtli.  The test demonstrated the kpinga's ability to use angular velocity by doing vertical throws at a crowd of warriors, one armed with a shield. The Kpinga maneuvered and deflected off the enemy shield and struck another target. Later, the weapon was tested using a horizontal toss to cut through pork leg stand-ins. For the Aztecs, the atlatl and tlacochtli were tested. The weapon was capable of hitting targets at great distances, and capable of piercing the Zande shield to kill its target.  However, the Kpinga proved to have more killing potential with multiple blades on the weapon, giving it the edge.
For special weapons, the Aztec Jaguar's tematlatl took the edge over the Zande Warrior's botto and pima.  The tematlatl was tested on skulls, and only three of the five skulls were hit. Further analysis showed some of the hits were not fatal. The botto and pima did not fare well during its test either. Despite the arrows being poison-tipped, they could not penetrate the Jaguar's cotton armor, preventing the poison from taking effect. The edge was ultimately given to the tematlatl, due to the weapon having better odds of killing its target.
The tematlatl is the only sling to be given the edge, and is also the only one to score more than one kill.
The tematlatl is the tenth weapon to be given the edge and score fewer kills than the opposing weapon.
The Aztec Jaguar is the fourth warrior to lose despite having the most effective weapon in the fight, which was the maquahuitl.
The Zande Warrior is the second warrior with at least one metal weapon to triumph over a warrior who has none.Reenactment 13The battle starts with an Aztec Jaguar and Zande Warrior each making their way to the top of rocky hills. The Aztec Jaguar sets his maquahuitl by a rock, and then climbs to the top of the hill. The two warriors eye each other, waiting for the other to strike. The Zande Warrior yells out a battle cry which echoes throughout the area. This prompts the Aztec Jaguar to raise his Atlatl and Tlacochtli arrow. He hurls the tlacochtli, which sails across the air and barely misses the Zande Warrior. He tries again, and succeeds in hitting the Zande's shield. The Zande Warrior removes the arrow from the shield and puts his Makrigga spear on the floor. He pulls out his Botto and Pima and climbs down the hill to run towards the Aztec Jaguar. The Jaguar sets up another Tlacochtli and throws it, missing the Zande Warrior again. He fires an arrow in retaliation and hits the Aztec Jaguar. The Aztec Jaguar sees the Zande Warrior rush towards him and pulls out the arrow from his cotton armor. He gets down from his hill and prepares his tematlatl. He swings it around and hurls a rock at the Zande Warrior, but misses him yet again. The Zande Warrior pulls out a Kpinga and throws it at the Aztec Jaguar. It strikes his leg and forces him to the ground. He gets up and begins to flee from the Zande. He runs behind a rock and picks up his maquahuitl. As the Zande Warrior catches up to him, the Aztec Jaguar swings the maquahuitl, cutting through the Zande's shield like butter, which surprises the Zande. He swings again and knocks off the Zande Warrior's headdress. He swings a third time, and slashes the chest. The Zande Warrior pulls out his Makraka and knocks the maquahuitl out of the Aztec's hands. He swings the Makraka at him, but it gets lodged in the Aztec's helmet. He struggles to free his weapon, but the Aztec Jaguar quickly reacts by slashing across the Zande's hip with his Tecpatl knife. The Zande Warrior falls to the ground in pain and begins rolling down the hill. The Aztec Jaguar removes his helmet, picks up his Maquahuitl and begins chasing the Zande Warrior, who is now back on his feet. The Zande Warrior rushes back to the top of his hill and runs back to the makrigga spear he put down earlier with the Aztec in hot pursuit. The Aztec Warrior catches up and prepares to swing his maquahuitl, but the Zande Warrior quickly turns around and thrusts the makrigga into the Jaguar's stomach. The Aztec stops in his tracks and begins spitting blood from his mouth. The Zande then pulls out the makrigga, yanking out a chunk of the Aztec's innards. The Aztec falls back and off the hill, dropping into the field below. The Zande Warrior pumps his fists into the air, yelling in victory.Winner: Zande WarriorEpisode 14: Nazi Waffen SS vs. Viet CongNazi Waffen SS team: Silvio Wolf Busch (Former German Military), Robert Wilhelm-McCain (German Military Historian)Nazi Waffen SS weapons: Mauser C-96 Pistol, MP 28, Bouncing Betty, Flammenwerfer 41Nazi Waffen SS armor: M-35 Steel Helmet (cammoflaged)Viet Cong team: Tuan Nguyen (Vietnam War Survivor), Danny Boyer (Viet Cong Weapons Expert)Viet Cong weapons: Tokarev TT-33 Pistol, MAT-49, POMZ-2 & F-1 Grenade, Punji StakesViet Cong armor: None

 For short-range weapons, the Mauser C-96 was tested against the Tokarev TT-33 in eliminating five targets. The TT-33 managed to eliminate the targets in 24 seconds with eight shots, while the C-96 eliminated the targets with 10 shots in only 12 seconds. The Mauser C-96's automatic fire capability was then demonstrated, emptying a full magazine in less than a second. The edge was given to the Mauser C-96 for its 20-round capacity and secondary autofire option.
 For long-range weapons, the MP 28 was tested against the MAT-49. It was determined that both SMGs performed almost equally in eliminating three targets in 30 seconds, resulting in a draw.
 For explosive weapons, the Bouncing Betty (Schrapnellmine) was tested against the F-1 Grenade-POMZ-2 Combination. The Bouncing Betty destroyed 4 targets and had an effective fragmentation radius of 15 yards while the F-1 Grenade decimated a pig carcass after its POMZ-2 host mine had been disarmed and removed. The edge was given to the F-1 Grenade and POMZ-2 Combination due to its anti-handling nature.
 For special weapons, the punji stakes were tested against the Flammenwerfer 41. The punji pit trap could still kill by infection if the victim did not fall in face first, while the punji spike ball trap could penetrate deep enough to hit vital organs. The Flammenwerfer 41 eliminated a group of targets and burned down a hut in the brief span of a few seconds. The edge was given to the Flammenwerfer 41, since it did not require its victims to fall in or activate a trip wire to be effective, and was capable of clearing out areas and neutralizing booby traps, thus preventing any form of surprise attacks.
 This is the fifth episode to have a tie in weapons edges.
 This is the only match up not to feature mid-range weapons, and the second to not have melee weapons.
 Despite the fact that they were not included in the weapons testing, rifles were used by both squads during the simulation (possibly the K98k and SKS).
 This is the first match-up where every tested weapon killed someone in the final battle.Reenactment 14The battle begins with members of a Viet Cong cell bringing in the beaten leader of the Nazi Waffen SS team as a prisoner. He is tossed to the ground and kicked around. Up ahead, the rest of the Nazi Waffen SS team is sneaking up on the Viet Cong's campsite to try to rescue their leader, setting up a Bouncing Betty along the way. The Viet Cong leader points his Tokarev TT-33 at the Nazi while interrogating him in Vietnamese. The Nazi leader only responds by spitting at his face. The angered Viet Cong leader cocks his Tokarev and prepares to execute the Waffen SS leader, but the rest of the Waffen SS squad jumps in and fires at the camp with MP 28 submachine guns and bolt-action rifles. The VC leader takes cover as one VC operative is killed and the Viet Cong team scrambles for their weapons as a skirmish ensues. In the confusion, the Nazi leader manages to escape from the clutches of the Viet Cong and rush into the jungle. One VC concentrates its fire and kills a Nazi soldier with his MAT-49 submachine gun. Seeing the VC soldiers become more assembled, the other Nazis fall back into the jungle as the rest of the Viet Cong gives chase. In the jungle, the Nazi leader runs into one of his fellow soldiers who gives him a Mauser C-96 pistol. The soldier leads on through the jungle, but quickly falls into a Punji Stake pit, which kills him. The Waffen SS leader grimaces as he watches his comrade fall and sees his still-twitching corpse. He turns around and sees two Viet Cong soldiers closing in, so he quickly runs further into the jungle. In another area, two more Viet Cong are catching up to two other Waffen SS soldiers. The two Waffen SS and a Viet Cong safely pass by a planted Bouncing Betty, but the second Viet Cong steps on the mine and dies. The two Waffen SS make their way to a small river. As one of them tries to cross, he trips a wire and activates the POMZ-2 mine which kills him. The other Nazi jumps across the river and kills an oncoming Viet Cong soldier with his MP 28 as he approaches the river. Meanwhile, the Waffen SS leader kills one of the two remaining Viet Cong members with his Mauser pistol and then makes his way across a small bridge over the river. The Viet Cong leader tries to follow, but is spotted by the other Waffen SS soldier. He attempts to shoot the last Viet Cong with his MP 28, but runs out of ammo. The Viet Cong leader shoots and kills the Waffen SS with his Tokarev. The two remaining leaders then exchange fire with each other with their pistols until both guns are depleted. The Waffen SS leader then finds his team's Kubelwagen and runs to it, finding a Flammenwerfer 41 flamethrower in the back. While the Viet Cong leader is loading a fresh magazine into his gun, his Nazi counterpart ducks for cover behind the car and straps on the flamethrower. The Viet Cong leader reloads and fires at the Kubelwagen while screaming in Vietnamese, but the Waffen SS leader jumps out from behind the car and shoots a burst of fire at him. The Viet Cong leader is set ablaze, fires one wild shot into the air, and slumps to the ground, screaming before dying. The Waffen SS leader examines the still-burning corpse, and then yells "Deutschland!" (Germany) in victory.Winner: Nazi Waffen SSEpisode 15: Roman Centurion vs. Rajput WarriorRoman Centurion team: Terence Rotolo (Ancient Combat Specialist), Matt Lasky (Roman Weapons Historian)Roman Centurion weapons: Gladius, Pilum, Scorpion, DolabraRoman Centurion armor: Lorica Hamata, Galea, ScutumRajput Warrior team: Gugun Deep Singh (Rajput Descendant/Weapons Expert), Bhajneet Singh (Gatka Martial Artist), Sukhwinder Singh (Aara Expert)Rajput Warrior weapons: Khanda, Aara, Chakram, KatarRajput Warrior armor: Coat of 10000 Nails, Steel Helmet, Steel Shield

 For short-range weapons, the gladius was tested against the khanda. The gladius was capable of chopping off arms(cutting cleanly through the bone), stabbing through the liver and through a rib and into the lung, and through a clavicle, while the khanda cut through five ribs on one cattle carcass, through the spine and through both sides of the ribcage on the second, and through the femur on the third. During the gladius test a scutum was also used in the fighting techniques but it was revealed on the aftermath episode that this was a strictly sword vs. sword comparison in terms of killing power. The edge was given to the khanda for its tremendous cutting power and longer blade.
 For mid-range weapons, the aara was tested against the pilum. The aara, when wielded against three targets, was only able to kill one and inflict minor injuries on the other two. The pilum, however, penetrated three blood bags and one Rajput shield. The edge was given to the pilum for its flexible killing potential as a spear and a throwing projectile.
 For long-range weapons, the chakrams were tested against the scorpion. The chakram severed a simulated neck while the scorpion demonstrated its superior range by delivering four kills at 25 yards and one kill at 50 yards. The edge was given to the chakram for its portability and faster rate of fire.
 For special weapons, the katars were tested against the dolabra. The katar was tested on a suspended pig carcass, impaling the carcass with multiple punches which were measured at over 200 pounds of force. The katar managed to both fracture and cut through the carcass's ribs, and a final blow (delivered with a version of the katar that spread out spring-loaded side blades) completely disemboweled the carcass. On a second pig carcass which was clad in lorica hamata, the katars punctured the carcass with four punches, the lorica hamata offering only slightly more resistance than the naked flesh of the first pig carcass. Dr. Armand Dorian examined the first puncture wound, claiming that it stabbed through the heart and punctured the back, claiming that the lorica hamata was "like a T-shirt to this weapon". The dolabra was tested against a ballistics gel torso clad in a Rajput's coat of 10000 nails. The dolabra's axe-end chopped down vertically onto the torso's left arm, shattering the bone, ripping through the biceps and the triceps, and severing the brachial artery. The axe-end also severed the top half of the skull in one blow, and almost severed the right arm (it fell off a few seconds later). The pick end was used to puncture the coat of 10000 nails twice, breaking a rib and puncturing the heart. Although both weapons were capable of penetrating butted chainmail and delivering killing blows, the edge was given to the dolabra for its longer reach.
The aara is the sixth weapon to score no kills in the simulation.
The dolobra is the eleventh weapon to be given the edge and score fewer kills than the opposing weapon in the episode.Reenactment 15The battle starts with a Rajput Warrior walking through a forest, investigating a clicking noise being made in the distance. As it turns out, the clicking noise is coming from the Roman Centurion cranking the lever on his Scorpion Crossbow. As the Rajput warrior gets closer and closer, the Roman Centurion loads a bolt into the Scorpion. The Rajput pokes his head from behind a tree and spots the Centurion. The Centurion fires his Scorpion, but the bolt misses the Rajput completely. He then pulls out his Pilum Javelin and charges at the Rajput, causing him to flee. The Centurion makes his way to a more open area, only to be met with one of the Rajput's Chakram discs. The Centurion blocks the Chakram with his shield and then throws his Pilum. The Rajput, however, pulls out his Khanda sword and parries the Javelin. The two warriors glare at each other, waiting for the other to make his move. The Rajput pulls out his Aara sword and whips it around. The Roman Centurion then takes his Dolabra and charges at the Rajput. The Rajput jumps back and tries to strike with his Aara, but the Centurion blocks with his shield. The Centurion lunges at the Rajput and swings his Dolabra, but the Rajput jumps out of the way. He then swings his Aara and coils it around the Centurion's leg. The Centurion completely falls over but is able to save himself from the Rajput by kicking a log at the Rajput and tripping him. The Centurion gets up with his Dolabra at hand and sees that the Rajput has also gotten up and pulled out his Khanda sword again. The Centurion swings at the Rajput, who moves back to avoid it. However, in doing so, he backs up and falls onto a giant log. The Centurion tries to take advantage and swing at the Rajput, but the Rajput rolls out of the way and causes the Dolabra to get stuck in the log. The Rajput then swings his sword and cuts the head of the Dolabra off from the handle. He prepares to swing at the Centurion, but the loss of the Dolabra's head allows the Centurion to swing the broken handle fast enough to hit the Rajput and knock him over. The Centurion pulls out his Gladius and begins swinging wildly at the Rajput, eventually knocking the Khanda out of his hands. He slashes the Rajput's face and forces him to the ground. He raises his sword and prepares to finish him off, but the Rajput puts on his Katar and stabs the Centurion in the stomach. The Centurion falls in pain, then looks up. The image of the Rajput wielding his Khanda is the last thing the Centurion sees before the Khanda tears into his face and kills him. The Rajput then pumps his fists in the air and yells in victory.Winner: Rajput WarriorEpisode 16: Somali Pirates vs. Medellin CartelSomali Pirate team: Abdi Ali (Somali Native/Army Veteran), Haji Ukajh (Somali Refugee/Weapons Expert)Somali Pirate weapons: Grappling Hook, AK-47, PKM Machine Gun, RPG-7Somali Pirate armor: NoneMedellin Cartel team: Michael Corleone Blanco (Son of Medellin Cartel Boss), Kenny "Kenji" Gallo (Former Cocaine Smuggler)Medellin Cartel weapons: Machete, Mini Uzi, M60 Machine Gun, Car BombMedellin Cartel armor: None

For short-range weapons, the machete was tested against the grappling hook. The machete cleaved off the arms and severed the throat of a gel torso as well as demonstrated the Colombian necktie, while the grappling hook ripped into a pig carcass. The edge was given to the machete since the grappling hook was not designed to be a weapon and can cause damage to the user.
For mid-range weapons, the Mini Uzi was tested against the AK-47. The Mini Uzi emptied an entire magazine into two targets inside a car with most of the hits being in the head and neck areas while the AK-47 killed two targets at 50yds and two targets at 100yds while fired from a small skiff. The edge was given to the AK-47 for its longer range and firepower.
For long-range weapons, the M60 was tested against the PKM in eliminating four moving targets. The PKM completed the test in 1m and 43s but jammed once while the M60 completed the test in 1m and 54s but jammed twice. The edge was given to the PKM for its higher rate of fire and better mechanical reliability.
For explosive weapons, the car bomb was tested against the RPG-7. Although the RPG-7 was portable and could be fired repeatedly at a distance, the edge was given to the car bomb for its better chance at killing multiple targets with its larger explosive payload.
This is the third squad on squad battle that featured four on four instead of the traditional five on five.
This is the first battle where a combatant eliminates himself and an opponent in a suicide (Pablo Escobar, who is wounded, detonates a Car Bomb, killing himself and the leader of the Somali Pirates).
The Somali Pirates are the sixth of thirteen warriors to win after scoring more kills at mid range and long range.
The car-bomb is the twelfth weapon to be given the edge and score fewer kills than the opposing weapon.Reenactment 16The battle starts with a group of Somali Pirates approaching a warehouse near a pier via motor boat. Inside the warehouse, Pablo Escobar and one of the Medellín Drug Cartel thugs are preparing packages of cocaine while a third member practices swinging his machete and a fourth dances to salsa music while holding an M60 machine gun. Outside, the Somali Pirates dock their boat and swarm on shore towards the warehouse. The head Pirate, armed with an AK-47, and two of his men, armed with a PKM Machine Gun and grappling hook, enter the warehouse while a fourth stays behind, shouldering his RPG-7 rocket launcher. Inside, they see the Cartel men relaxing and Escobar giving one of them a package of cocaine. As the thug goes to put it away, the PKM pirate jumps out and kills him with the machine gun. Escobar, alerted to the gunfire, grabs an Uzi while the dancing thug holds out his M60 machine gun and fires back. In the shadows, the other Cartel thug with the machete tries to sneak up on one of the Somali Pirates while they are distracted by the gunfire. The hook Pirate spots him as he charges and tries to fight back with his Grappling Hook. He parries the oncoming swing and hits the Cartel thug in his stomach. The thug counters in response by amputating the Pirate's hand and then slashing his neck. The lead Somali Pirate hears the commotion and turns and kills the Cartel man with his AK-47 with a single shot to the face. The other Cartel henchman continues to fire his M60, but it gets jammed. He drops it and picks up an Uzi. Both he and Pablo Escobar try to make a run for it. The PKM Pirate tries to shoot Escobar, but misses. The head Pirate signals for him to run after the remaining Cartel members. Escobar runs down stairs, and turns around when he hears the Pirate leader chasing him. The Pirate takes cover behind a corner, and the two begin to exchange gunfire. The Somali Pirate eventually manages to shoot Escobar in the left shoulder, who falls to the floor and lies motionless. The Pirate steps on him as he comes down the stairs and takes his cigar and smokes it in satisfaction. Meanwhile, the other Cartel member climbs up stairs and enters a room. When the other Somali Pirate opens the door, the Cartel thug opens fire with his Uzi and kills him. He sneers at the dead body and spits on it. Meanwhile, the head Pirate sees a car with cocaine and a bag of money. He gets in the driver's seat and begins honking the horn to get the rocket Pirate who chose to stay outside. He hears the horn and makes his way toward the garage. However, the head Pirate is unaware that Pablo Escobar, who is behind the car, is still alive. Escobar struggles to get up, but his wounds are so bad that he cannot. He sees the Pirate in the car and pulls out a remote. He sets himself up with his remaining strength and looks under the car, where a bomb is situated. Realizing that he has no other options, he presses the button on the remote as the other Pirate approaches the garage. The bomb goes off, destroying the car and killing both Escobar and the head Pirate while sending the last Pirate to the asphalt. The last Cartel member hears the explosion and runs for an exit. The Somali Pirate sits up and starts to clean off the debris when he sees the last Cartel member exiting from a door. He stands up and prepares his RPG-7 Rocket Launcher. The Cartel member sees him and desperately tries to go back inside, only to find that the door is locked from the inside and cannot be opened. The Pirate fires the rocket, which flies at the Cartel thug and blows up, obliterating him. The remaining Pirate roars in victory and walks away.Winner: Somali PiratesEpisode 17: Persian Immortal vs. CeltPersian Immortal team: Ardeshir Radpour (Persian Historian/Equestrian), Cyrus Zahiri (Persian Sword Master)Persian Immortal weapons: Sagaris, Spear, Bow & Arrow, Chariot ScythePersian Immortal armor: Bronze Scale & Wicker ShieldCelt team: Francis Brebner (Highland Games Champion), Spencer Dinnean (Celtic Warrior Descendant), Dave Baker (Blade Master)Celt weapons: Long Sword, Lancea, Sling, BurdaCelt armor: Mail, Leather Belt & Wood Shield

This was the first episode where the warrior's performance was affected by chariot.
For short-range weapons, the Celtic long sword was tested against the sagaris. The long sword decapitated a gel torso in three hits at 74 mph, breaking through the spinal cord on the first swing and through the cheekbone on the second swing. Tested against the Persian Immortal's armor, the long sword struck off metal scales with a force of 280 psi, enough to break a rib behind the armor. It cut a gel head through the nose and to the brain from the back of a chariot. With the pick end of the sagaris, Cyrus Zahiri penetrated a ballistics gel torso multiple times, visually breaking through several ribs and puncturing the bottom portion of the heart, causing a very rapid death by bleed-out. The sagaris also punctured a curve in the upper intestine, causing waste matter to openly spill into the interior of the abdomen, causing a septic death. Later, the sagaris was tested against a dummy wearing Celtic armor; an iron coolus helmet(with a pressure sensor attached to the head beneath), a large leather belt, and an iron-rimmed wooden shield. The Persian Immortal expert used the sagaris as a fulcrum to pull away the shield, punctured the coolus helmet with the pick end(penetrating the frontal lobe of the brain and generating a force of over 323 psi), stabbed the naked torso, and punctured the leather belt. However, the sagaris only managed to inflict a flesh wound beneath the leather belt, and took several seconds to be removed. The edge was given to the long sword for its faster recovery time.
For mid-range weapons, the lancea was tested against the Persian spear. The lancea went through a pig carcass when it was thrown as a javelin while the Persian spear killed two human-shaped targets from the back of a chariot. The first target was stabbed in the nape of the neck, piercing the carotid artery and the jugular vein and causing death by rapid bleed-out. The second target was stabbed directly in the heart and drug behind the chariot for several feet. The edge was given to the Persian spear since it was not a disposable missile weapon, like the lancea, and had a thinner tip to facilitate deeper penetration.
For long-range weapons, the bow and arrow was tested against the sling. The bow and arrow's effective range was 50 yards while the sling delivered two kills and three wounds with five shots. The edge was given to the bow and arrow for its superior range, accuracy, rate of fire, and lethality.
For special weapons, the burda club was tested against the chariot scythe. The burda club exploded seven heads at roughly 273 psi while the chariot scythe failed to kill either of its two pig targets. The edge was given to the burda for its simplicity, portability, and the failure of the chariot scythe.
The Persian Immortal is one of three warriors to get at least 100 kills with each weapon.
This is the most lopsided episode of Season 2.
The Persian Immortal is the seventh warrior of fourteen who won after scoring more kills at mid range and long range.
The burdha is the thirteenth weapon to be given the edge and score fewer kills than the opposing weapon in the episode.Reenactment 17The battle begins in an open field with the Persian Immortal and Celt in their own chariots, each with its own charioteer. The Celt raises his Long Sword and points at the other chariot, signaling his charioteer to advance. The Immortal signals for his chariot to charge as well. As the two chariots race across the field, the Immortal fires an arrow from his bow and hits the Celt's charioteer in his chest. The Persian chariot closes in and breaks one of the Chariot's wheels with a Chariot Scythe. The collision throws the Celt off of his chariot and flips the chariot over. The Celt runs up to the fallen vehicle and grabs his Lancea, choosing to abandon his shield. With a loud battle cry, he charges at the Persian Immortal and his chariot. The Persian fires another arrow, but misses. As he readies another arrow, the Celt throws his Lancea. It misses, but it distracts the Immortal and prevents him from getting a clear shot. The Celt runs past the Persian chariot, vaulting over the incoming Scythe. He grabs his Lancea and tries to distance himself from the chariot. He realizes that it will not do him any good, however, and chooses to discard it in favor of his Sling. The Persian Immortal jumps off his chariot with his spear and shield just before the Celt swings his Sling around and throws a rock. The rock hits the Persian charioteer and knocks him unconscious. The Immortal runs towards the Celt, but the Celt picks up his Lancea just as the Immortal approaches him. He thrusts at the Immortal, knocking his spear out of his hand. The Immortal tries to back off, but the Celt jumps up and kicks him. The Immortal draws his Sagaris axe and glares at the Celt. The two begin to swing at each other, but cannot pull off a successful blow. After a few misses, the Celt aims at the Immortal's thigh and stabs it. The Persian Immortal yells in pain and swings, forcing the Celt to pull out his Lancea. The Immortal tries an overhand swing, but the Celt blocks with his Lancea. The Persian seizes the opportunity to kick him in the stomach and knock him down. The Celt gets back up and draws his Long Sword and Burda club. He distracts the Immortal with the Long Sword, and then hits the Immortal with the club. The Persian Immortal blocks the Long Sword with his Sagaris, but the Celt kicks him again. The Celt tries to finish the fight with a stab, but the Immortal rolls out of the way. He gets back up and swings the Sagaris, but the Celt parries and hits him twice with the Burda Club. The Immortal falls to the floor, but manages to roll over and block the Long Sword with the Sagaris. He gets up and spins around the Sagaris, piercing the Celt's arm. The Celt hits the Sagaris out of the Persian Immortal's hands and leaves him without a weapon. The Immortal runs away, forcing the Celt to chase him down, dropping the Burda from his wounded arm. The Immortal finds his spear lying on the ground and grabs it. He thrusts it at the Celt twice, but misses. The Celt tries to swing the sword downward, but the Immortal flips the Spear over and hits him in the head with the iron counterweight on the bottom of the spear. The Celt throws his head back in pain, giving the Immortal enough time to flip the Spear again and stab the Celt in the chest. He drives the Spear harder through the leather armor and forces the Celt to the floor. The Immortal pushes the spear deeper until blood spews out of the Celt's mouth as the Immortal pulls out his spear. The Persian Immortal, standing over the dead body, raises his spear and yells, "Parsa!" (Persia) in victory.Winner: Persian ImmortalEpisode 18: K.G.B. vs. C.I.A.K.G.B. team: Pavel Ksendz (K.G.B. Operator Descendant), Stass Klassen (Former Russian Military)K.G.B. weapons: Shoe Knife, Camera Gun, Skorpion SMG-61, Dead Drop SpikeK.G.B. armor: NoneC.I.A. team: Mike Baker (Former C.I.A. Agent), Frank Dowse (Former Defense Intelligence)C.I.A. weapons: Garrote, Briefcase Gun, MAC-10, Exploding CigarC.I.A. armor: None

For short-range weapons, the shoe knife was tested against the garrote. The shoe knife ripped through a pig carcass and could cause profuse bleeding if it hits an artery or vital organ. The force of a kick with the shoe knife was measured at 605 psi. It was implied that against a real person, the bloodletting would not have been as spectacular as it was on the pig carcass, as most of the bleeding would have been internal. The garrote decapitated a gel torso but was determined to be heavily dependent on a surprise attack from behind. The edge was given to the shoe knife since it was more flexible and less disadvantaged than the garrote.
For mid-range weapons, the briefcase gun was tested against the camera gun. The briefcase gun killed a target with a lethal shot to the liver while the camera gun achieved an instant kill by driving a .22 bullet through the left nostril of a gel head. The edge was given to the briefcase gun since it contained a 9mm PPK which was a heavier caliber and longer range weapon that could be fired multiple times.
For long-range weapons, the MAC-10 was tested against the Skorpion SMG-61 in eliminating five targets. The Skorpion delivered three kills but left one wounded and one alive in 12 seconds while the MAC-10 delivered five kills in 20 seconds. The edge was given to the MAC-10 for its heavier caliber, 30-round magazine, faster rate of fire, and better accuracy.
For explosive weapons, the exploding cigar was tested against the booby-trapped dead drop spike. The cigar completely destroyed the upper and lower jaw of a gel head but was determined to be very unreliable due to its timed fuse and small explosive payload while the explosive trap concealed in the dead drop spike decimated a mannequin. The edge was given to the dead drop spike for its higher success rate at killing a target with its SEMTEX payload and "fail-deadly tamper" trigger.
This is the first, and currently only, episode where every combatant in the final battle has an identity (albeit secret), as well as the first battle to have female combatants.
The CIA is one of six warriors without a battle cry at the end.
The CIA is the eighth of fourteen warriors to win after scoring more kills at mid range and long range.
The female KGB agent (KGB 004) earned 2 kills, making her the first female on the show to kill in the simulation.Reenactment 18A CIA Agent (001) is walking up to an embassy of the USSR carrying a briefcase, while a nearby CIA Agent (002) keeps a lookout with binoculars in a nearby van. Behind CIA 001, a Russian KGB Agent (001) shadows him as they walk into the Embassy. Inside, CIA 001 is making a business transaction with KGB 002, a double agent who sells off a roll of camera film for the briefcase full of US currency. With their business done, CIA 001 offers KGB 002 a cigar to which he happily obliges. CIA 001 smirks as KGB 002 takes his last puff and the cigar explodes, blowing off KGB 002's face. CIA 001 slips the film into his vest pocket, grabs the briefcase and leaves the office. In the lobby of the embassy, two KGB Agents (003 and 004) are shooting a film with a camera, while a nearby CIA Agent (003) sits around listlessly with his briefcase. KGB 003 turns to face CIA 001 with the camera and shoots him at point-blank range. Seeing this, CIA 003 immediately stands up and shoots KGB 003 with his briefcase. As KGB 003 falls down dead, KGB 004 pulls out her silenced Skorpion sub-machine gun and fires at CIA 003, shooting him in the back and killing him as he dives behind cover. KGB 004 kneels down to the deceased CIA 001 and steals the camera film as CIA Agents 004 and 005 storm the lobby with silenced MAC 10 submachine guns. KGB 004 gets to an elevator and fires out from cover, impeding the CIA agents' pursuit as the elevator doors close. Inside the elevator, KGB 004 inspects the film and puts it into a Dead Drop Spike. The elevator doors open and KGB 004 comes face-to-face with KGB 001 with both their guns raised at each other. Recognizing each other, the agents lower their weapons and leave as KGB 004 gives 001 the Dead Drop Spike. Outside the embassy, KGB Agent 005 awaits his fellow agents, unaware that he is being watched by CIA 002 from across the street. Back inside the embassy, KGB 001 and 004 are making their way through a kitchen when CIA 004 and 005 catch up to them. The CIA agents open fire, wounding KGB 001 as KGB 004 fires back, shoving the wounded KGB 001 out of the crossfire. CIA 004 and 005 dive for cover behind the counter and move their way up with CIA 005 pushing a serving dolly in front of her. As CIA 005 nears the end of the counter, KGB 004 runs up and gets behind the other side of the dolly, pushing objects down on CIA 005. Both agents stand up and struggle to shoot each other, but KGB 004 gets the upper hand and kills the female CIA agent. While she is still standing, CIA 004 pops out and quickly dispatches the femme fatale with a short burst of machine gun fire. Meanwhile, the wounded KGB 001 agent makes his way upstairs, while CIA 004 pursues closely, following his bloody trail to a nearby restroom. As CIA 004 prepares to inspect a stall, KGB 001 jumps out and engages the agent, clicking his heels together and unsheathing a shoe knife. The KGB agent kicks and manhandles the CIA agent, but CIA 004 manages to retaliate by plunging the MAC into his stomach and firing, killing KGB 001. As KGB 001 slumps against the wall, CIA 004 reaches into his pockets and takes the Dead Drop Spike. He attempts to open it, but fails to open it the correct way and is blown up. Outside, KGB 005 hears the explosion and gets out of his car, stuffing his Skorpion into his coat as he enters the embassy. Across the street, CIA 002 sees the careless agent exiting his car and leaves the safety of his van. Inside the embassy, KGB 005 sees the carnage caused by the now deceased CIA and KGB agents. With the film roll destroyed and the CIA killed in action, the KGB agent returns to his car, unaware that CIA 002 is lying in wait. As KGB 005 attempts to start his car, CIA 002 pops out from the back seat with a garrote wire and strangles the KGB agent. The agent struggles helplessly as the wire cuts into his neck, then relaxes into death and slumps against the seat. His job finished, the CIA agent exits the car, wiping his bloodied hands with a towel and adjusting his scarf as he walks away.Winner: C.I.A.Episode 19: Vlad the Impaler vs. Sun TzuVlad the Impaler team: Vaclav Havlik (Medieval Sword Master), Brahm Gallagher (Vlad Historian)Vlad the Impaler weapons: Kilij, Halberd, Steel Crossbow, Hand CannonVlad the Impaler armor: Plated mail, Steel Helmet, Steel ShieldSun Tzu team: Johnny Yang (Chinese Martial Arts Champ), Tommy Leng (Ancient Chinese Weapons Expert)Sun Tzu weapons: Jian, Zhua, Repeating Crossbow, Flaming ArrowsSun Tzu armor: Leather Lamellar, Bronze Helmet

This match-up is the most lopsided time-wise, with Sun Tzu traditionally believed to have been alive between 544–496 BC (during the Bronze Age), and Vlad III between 1431–1476 AD (during the Middle Ages), a difference of 1927 years between Sun Tzu's death and Vlad's birth.
For short-range weapons, the kilij was tested against the jian. The kilij cleanly sliced through a pig carcass with all of its four swings, leading the hosts to call it the only weapon they could compare to the katana. Meanwhile, the rapier-like jian could cleanly pierce through and cut up another pig carcass, piercing the aorta, and severing bone. The edge was given to the kilij for its devastating cutting power.
For mid-range weapons, the zhua (a solid iron pole with a claw) was tested against the halberd. The zhua tore apart a gel head in three strikes (causing a depressed fracture in every bone in the face), while the halberd pierced and ripped through the bones on a side of beef with the axe, hook, and pike portions of the blade, including severing 6 inches into the thickest part of the femur and piercing to the spinal cord. The edge was given to the halberd for its killing power and the flexibility of its hook, spike, and axe head.
For long-range weapons, the repeating crossbow was tested against the steel crossbow. The repeating crossbow fired 20 shots in the span of 30 seconds, and was shown capable of penetrating the chain part of Vlad's plated chainmail although it was a glancing wound. In all, the crossbow delivered seven hits. However, the steel crossbow could only get off two shots and delivered only one kill with the second bolt bouncing off Sun Tzu's leather armor. The edge was given to the repeating crossbow for its superior rate of fire.
For special weapons, the hand cannon was tested against the flaming arrow. The hand cannon was described as the most accurate black powder weapon yet seen on the show. It delivered three kill shots and could be used as a spiked club if Vlad missed or ran out of ammunition. The flaming arrow could kill a group of enemies standing in a large sesame oil-soaked area of dry brush through severe fire burns or smoke inhalation but when it was tested directly against Vlad's plated chainmail armor, the first two shots bounced off the plates. A third shot only inflicted a shallow wound, with the flame actually aiding Vlad by stopping blood loss from the wound with the heat from the flame. The edge was given to the hand cannon for its firepower and secondary function as a melee weapon, as demonstrated by Gallagher.
Vlad's method of impalement was also demonstrated in this episode on a gel dummy. The stake was inserted through the posterior and, as gravity carried the body downward as it pierced the lung and all major blood vessels in the torso before breaking the clavicle and exiting through the shoulder.
Vlad the Impaler was only the third warrior to receive the edge in 3 out of the 4 tests (the Māori Warrior and SWAT team being the others).
Vlad the Impaler is the first of two warriors who killed using non-factored methods in the simulation (coincidentally, the other warrior is the Vampire, which stems from Count Dracula, who was inspired by Vlad the Impaler).
This is the second of three episodes to have a warrior with at least one gunpowder-based weapon lose over one who does not.Reenactment 19The battle starts out with Vlad sneaking up to Sun Tzu's campsite, where Sun Tzu has sat down to a cup of tea. Close by, Vlad sets his shield into the ground and readies his hand cannon, firing a shot which destroys the general's teapot. Vlad laughs as he has taken the general off guard, but Sun Tzu raises his repeating crossbow and gets off a few shots and runs away. Vlad ducks behind his shield but is struck in the shoulder. Relatively unharmed, Vlad pulls out the bolt and readies his hand cannon again, but Sun Tzu is nowhere to be seen. Collecting his effects (a steel helmet, his shield, and his halberd), Vlad runs off searching for Sun Tzu. But the general is not far away as he gets the drop on Vlad by shooting him from a tree with a flaming arrow. Vlad is thrown to the ground by the force of the shot, but still remains relatively unharmed as he scrambles to his feet while putting out the small fire. Sun Tzu jumps down from the tree, but is promptly stabbed in the thigh by Vlad's halberd. Sun Tzu yells in pain and strikes the halberd with the edge of his hand, breaking it at the head, astonishing Vlad. Sun Tzu kicks Vlad in the face while he is still distracted and pulls out the halberd, hobbling away as Vlad gets back up and collects his helmet and shield again. Not far away, Sun Tzu pulls out a spare set of his armor and a Zhua hidden underneath fallen foliage. Above him, the Impaler watches him, preparing his steel crossbow. Vlad walks a little way and sees the general's armor nearby and takes his shot. The armor falls over and Vlad goes to investigate, only to find that he shot a decoy. The real general then jumps down, disarming Vlad from his shield using the Zhua. Vlad dodges another swing from the Zhua and draws his kilij, slashing Sun across the midsection as he recovers. The general falls back again, as Vlad pulls off his gauntlet, revealing that the Zhua managed to cut his forearm. The enraged Vlad picks up his kilij and charges Sun Tzu, who pulls out his Jian and clashes with the warrior king. Both warriors cross swords until when Vlad thrusts, piercing Sun Tzu eye, as he falls to the ground, we hear offscreen screams of Sun Tzu revealing himself impaled on a cross dead.Winner: Vlad the ImpalerEpisode 20: Ming Warriors vs. French MusketeersMing Warrior team: Jonathan Weizhang Wang (Kung Fu World Champion), Phillip Dang (Combative Wushu Champion)Ming Warrior weapons: Dao, 3-Barrel Pole Gun, Nest of Bees, Mechanical LandmineMing Warrior armor: Leather LamellarFrench Musketeer team: Xavier Declie (French Combat Historian), Luke Lafontaine (Sword Master)French Musketeer weapons: Rapier & Main Gauche, Wheel Lock Pistol, Flintlock Musket, GrenadeFrench Musketeer armor: Steel Cuirass

For short-range weapons, the rapier and main gauche combination was tested against the dao. The rapier/main gauche combo delivered five kill strikes against a gel torso in 16 seconds while the dao delivered five kill strikes against two pig carcasses in only seven seconds. The rapier struck through a synthetic eyeball(cutting it in half) and stabbed into the brain, stabbed the throat and severed the jugulars and the carotid artery, and stabbed between two ribs and pierced the heart. The main gauche stabbed into the abdomen and through the remaining synthetic eyeball and into the brain. The rapier's thrusting speed was measured at 5.9 feet per second, or roughly 4 mph. The dao perforated a pig carcass and was judged to hit the aorta and/or several vital organs if the same thrust was to be performed on a person, while the dao also cut two pig carcasses in half with two strikes each. The dao's thrusting speed was measured at roughly 4.9 mph. The edge was given to the dao since it could be used both for thrusting and slashing.
For mid-range weapons, the wheel lock pistol was tested against the 3-barrel pole gun against the other team's armor. The wheel lock pistol penetrated the Ming Warrior's studded leather armor and deliver three kill shots but misfired two times during its test while the 3-barrel pole gun was unable to penetrate the Musketeer's steel cuirass and could only inflict one kill and one wound. The edge was given to the wheel lock pistol due to the pole gun's failure.
For long-range weapons, the nest of bees was tested against the flintlock musket. Of the 32 rockets that were fired against a small battalion of dummy targets by the nest of bees, only six of them hit with three of them being kill shots while the flintlock musket fired off three shots and inflicted one kill and two wounds on a gel torso. The edge was given to the musket for its accuracy, heavy caliber, and option to mount a plug bayonet.
For special weapons, the mechanical landmine was tested against the grenade against four targets. The mechanical landmine killed all four of its targets upon detonation while the grenade only killed two of its targets and left the other two alive. The edge was given to the landmine for its larger explosive payload.
The French Musketeers are the ninth warriors of thirteen to win after scoring more kills at mid range and long range.
The dao is the fourteenth weapon to be given the edge and score fewer kills than the opposing weapon.Reenactment 20The battle starts with a band of five Musketeers making their way through a forest. Up ahead, four Ming Warriors emerge from a cave on a cliff, waiting for the Musketeers. A fifth is down below, setting up a Mechanically Triggered Land Mine and sticking a sword on top of it as bait. One of the Ming Soldiers opens up the Nest of Bees and launches a barrage of arrows at the Musketeers. The head Musketeer alerts his comrades, forcing them all to run back to avoid the arrows. One, however, is slow and is struck in the leg. He yanks the arrow from his leg and angrily throws it at the ground. Another Musketeer aims his musket at the head Ming Warrior. Just as the Ming Warrior makes his battle cry, the Musketeer shoots and kills him. The Musketeers then advance towards their enemy, with the one struck in the leg struggling to keep up. One of the Ming Warriors readies his 3-Barrel Pole Gun and fires at the Musketeers. One gets hit and knocked to the ground, but survives due to his armor stopping the projectile. The Ming Warrior prepares to fire another shot, but a Musketeer shoots him with the musket before he gets a chance. He falls over and rolls down the hill. The Musketeer shot by the Pole Gun is assisted in getting back onto his feet, only to be shot in the head by another Ming Warrior's Pole Gun. The Ming Warrior then retreats further back. A Musketeer sticks a bayonet onto his musket and walks up to the injured Ming Soldier, who is trying to unsheath his Dao. The Musketeer steps on him and jams the bayonet into him, killing him. The Musketeers regroup and continue to run after the three remaining Ming Warriors. The Ming Warrior that killed the first Musketeer desperately tries to escape, passing by the sword stuck in the ground. As the Musketeers chase him down, the injured one takes notice of the sword. Thinking that it would be of use later, he hobbles up to the sword and pulls it out. The land mine goes off and kills the Musketeer. The others see his bloody body and briefly mourn their dead friend before advancing toward the Ming Warriors. The Ming Warrior running from the Musketeers fires his Pole Gun again and kills a Musketeer. Another tries to shoot him with his musket, but misses. The Ming Warrior hides behind a rock and desperately tries to reload his weapon. The two remaining Musketeers hear him as they approach the rock. The Musketeer with the musket starts to go around the rock, but the leader stops him, pulling out a grenade. The first Musketeer smiles as he lights it with a match. The Musketeer hurls the Grenade over the rock, which blows up and kills the Ming Warrior. As the Musketeers look at his dead body while passing by, another Ming Warrior jumps out with his Dao sword and kills one of them with a strike to the neck. The head Musketeer tries to fire his Wheel Lock Pistol, but it winds up jamming. He throws it aside and pulls out his Rapier. The Ming Warrior tries to attack the Musketeer, but is shoved aside. The Ming Warrior tries again, but the Musketeer parries and stabs him in the stomach. The Ming Warrior falls to the ground and dies. The Musketeer hears a yell and turns around, only to find the head Ming Warrior standing on a cliff above him and also armed with a Dao, swinging it wildly. The Musketeer climbs up and engages the Ming Warrior in a duel. Eventually, the two fighters lock swords. The Musketeer uses this moment of opportunity to pull out his Main Gauche. He closes in and stabs the Ming Warrior in the stomach with the dagger. He pulls it out and allows the Ming Warrior to fall to his death. The Musketeer raises his sword and yells out "Vive le Roi!" (Long live the King!) in victory.Winner: French MusketeersEpisode 21: Comanche vs. MongolComanche team: Joaquin Gonzalez (Comanche Horseman), Jay Redhawk (Master Horse Archer)Comanche weapons: War Hawk, War Lance, Bow & Arrow, Scalping KnifeComanche armor: Hair Pipe Breastplate, Buffalo Hide ShieldMongol team: Munkhtur Luvsanjambaa (Native Mongol Historian), Jason Nguyen (Asian Combat Expert)Mongol weapons: Flanged Mace, Glaive, Bow & Arrow, IldMongol armor: Leather Lamellar, Leather Shield

For short-range weapons, the war hawk was tested against the mace, the tests being performed on a ballistics gel skull flanked by two synthetic bone skulls, one of which had a pressure sensor attached to the crown. The war hawk delivered death blows to all three skulls in 32 seconds, piercing into the brainpans with a force of roughly 300 psi, while also stabbing upwards through the gel skull's cheekbone and into the lower portion of the brain, tearing off the top half of the skull. However, the war hawk was stuck for several seconds in the second bone skull and had to be shaken off before moving on to the ballistics skull. The iron flanged mace completely shattered all three skulls in 16 seconds, with a force of over 300 psi; Max Geiger claimed that the mace left a skull more unidentifiable than a shot from a 1-ounce slug, while Dr. Armand Dorian claimed that the torque of the strike meant that even a helmeted opponent would be killed due to a broken neck. The edge was given to the iron flanged mace for its tremendous killing power.
For mid-range weapons, the war lance was tested against the glaive. The war lance was tested from horseback against two stand-ins on foot and a ballistics gel torso mounted on a horse stand-in; striking at 40 mph at the point of impact, the war lance stabbed all three targets at the bottom of the heart, the tip reaching the spinal cord on the gel torso. Against a second gel torso that was clad in a Mongol's hardened leather cuirass, the war lance actually penetrated deeper than against naked ballistics gel, striking 10–12 inches beneath the ribcage. The glaive was tested on a horse-shaped slab of beef which was mounted on a zip-line to simulate motion, stabbing between the ribs at 32 mph and delivering a blow which would have struck the heart and/or the lungs on an actual horse. Although the glaive had a longer tip, the edge was given to the war lance since the glaive could not be used on horseback.
For long-range weapons, the Comanche bow was tested against the Mongol bow against seven targets. The Comanche bow delivered six hits and achieved four kills and one wound in 28s and was capable of firing three arrows at once. The Mongol bow delivered five hits and achieved four kills in 33s. Both archers had one missed shot. The edge was given to the Comanche bow for its speed and accuracy.
For special weapons, the ild short sword was tested against the scalping knife. The ild cut apart a pig carcass in 10 strikes, visually severing the ribcage and spinal cord. The ild's striking speed was clocked at 67 miles per hour. The scalping knife disemboweled another pig carcass with several strikes, inflicting wounds on the torso which would have inflicted a collapsed lung on a human target (but would not have been instant kills in and of themselves), stabbing into the neck and striking the jugular vein and/or carotid artery, and disembowelling the pig with a dragging vertical slice down the abdomen. The scalping knife's stabbing speed was clocked at roughly 30 miles per hour, with Geoff Desmoulins claiming that the hand speed of the Comanche expert was faster; however, the precise data was never divulged. Before the test, the Comanche expert also demonstrated a scalping on a synthetic skull that was dressed in synthetic skin and hair; however, only the visual was displayed, with no information on the potential deadliness of the scalping. The edge was given to the ild sword for its bigger size and cutting power.
The Mongol is one of three warriors to get at least 100 kills with each weapon, and is the only warrior to lose while doing so.
The Comanche is the tenth of thirteen warriors to win after scoring more kills at mid range and long range.
The flanged mace is the fifteenth weapon to be given the edge and score fewer kills than the opposing weapon.Reenactment 21In a valley, the Mongol is sharpening his Ild sword. Nearby, the Comanche cautiously makes his way to the top of the ridge overlooking the valley. The Mongol, feeling as if he's being watched, looks to the top of the ridge. Seeing nothing, he goes back to sharpening his Ild. Back up on the ridge, the Comanche readies his bow and arrow and fires downward to the unsuspecting Mongol. The arrow lands a foot away from the Mongol, startling him. He stands up and looks to the source of the arrow, but is unable to make it out due to the Comanche standing against the sun. Using this opportunity, the Comanche fires two more arrows at the blinded Mongolian, one which flies past him and another which lands right in front of him. The Comanche raises his bow and gives off a loud war cry and falls back. Gathering his senses, the Mongol sheaths his Ild and mounts his horse, while the Comanche thrusts his War Lance into the ground and slings his War Hawk on his back. The Mongol reaches the top of the hill, but is confused when he only finds the Comanche's horse. Hanging off the side of the horse, the Comanche pulls himself up to reveal himself, takes aim with his bow and arrow, and shoots the Mongol in the chest. The Mongol is saved by his lamellar breastplate, however, as he angrily thrusts his glaive into the ground and pulls out the arrow. The Comanche rides ahead to set up another attack while the Mongol pulls out his bow and arrow. The Comanche rides past as the Mongol fires another shot, which barely misses him. The Comanche rides up to his War Lance, which he pulls out of the ground and hides into the bushes. The Mongol rides up to his glaive and pulls it out, seeing the Comanche's horse up on the rocky outcropping. The Mongol starts to ride to the abandoned horse when the Comanche ambushes him by tackling him from a rock, throwing him from his horse. The Comanche assumes a battle stance while the Mongol gathers himself and his Glaive. The Mongol swings his glaive but is parried by the Comanche's War Lance. The Mongol counters by slashing at the Comanche's back. The Comanche rolls, dropping his lance as he also avoids a circular slash. The Mongol goes in for a thrust, but the Comanche grabs the glaive and avoids the attack and counters with an elbow strike to the Mongol's head. The Comanche stomps on the glaive, breaking it as the Mongol gets back up and unsheathes his Ild. The Comanche pulls out his War Hawk and the two warriors clash. The Mongol deflects a swing and counters, slashing the Comanche's forearm. The Mongol goes in for a follow-up swing while the Comanche is still stunned, but the Comanche counters by grabbing the arms of the Mongol and hitting the Ild out of his hands, then spinning around and digging the War Hawk into the back of the Mongol. The Mongol pushes the War Hawk away as the Comanche gets it out and front kicks the Comanche, knocking him to the ground. The Comanche recovers and runs off into a cave while the Mongol runs back to his horse to retrieve his Flanged Mace and follows the Comanche into the cave. Inside the cave, the Mongol slowly searches out the Comanche, who has his back to a wall and is holding his War Hawk as well as a Scalping Knife. The Mongol spots the Comanche and swings his mace, which impacts on the cave wall as the Comanche dodges. The Mongol takes aim and swings the heavy mace again, hitting the floor as the Comanche dodges and gets set up for a counter-attack. The Comanche goes in for a swing with the War Hawk, but the Mongol counters with a swing that hits the Native American in the back, sending him reeling. The Mongol swings again, but the Comanche ducks under and quickly stabs the Mongol in the side with his Scalping Knife. The Mongol goes in for another swing, but misses as the Comanche ducks and goes in for two more stabs. While the Mongol is stunned, the Comanche grabs his War Hawk and buries it into the neck of the Mongol. The Mongol slumps to the cave floor, dead as the Comanche removes his hat and cuts off the Mongol's scalp with his Scalping Knife. Victorious, the Comanche stumbles out of the cave mouth, shouting as he holds the bloody scalp on high.Winner: ComancheEpisode 22: Navy SEALs vs. Israeli CommandosNavy SEAL team: Rob Roy (22 Year SEAL Veteran), Colin Palmer (Former SEAL Explosives Expert)Navy SEAL weapons: Recon 1 Knife, SIG Sauer P226, M4 Colt Commando, C4Navy SEAL armor: Combat helmetIsraeli Commando team: Moti Horenstein (Israeli Special Forces Instructor), Mike Kanarek (Israeli Special Forces Veteran)Israeli Commando weapons: KA-BAR Knife, Glock 19, Micro Galil, SemtexIsraeli Commando armor: KASDA helmet

This is the first match-up where the competitors are allies who train with each other in real life.
For short-range weapons, the KA-BAR was tested against the Recon 1 in cutting up a gel torso. Mike, wielding the KA-BAR, ripped apart the gel torso with a stabbing speed of 29fps(severing the windpipe, the spinal cord, and every major blood vessel in the neck, starting with an initial kill shot to an artery) while Rob, wielding the Recon 1, decapitated, amputated, and disemboweled the gel torso with a stabbing speed of 32fps. Both men's stabbing speed was determined to be slightly less than the punching speed of the average Olympic boxer. The panel was indecisive as to which knife was better and considered both weapons to be equally effective, resulting in a draw.
For mid-range weapons, the Glock 19 was tested against the SIG Sauer P226 in breaking five lights and eliminating two targets inside a mock-up bistro. The SEALS completed the challenge in 13.84s while the Commandos completed the challenge in 20.03s due to missing with a few shots against the lights. The edge was given to the SIG P226 for the better shooting of the SEALS.
For long-range weapons, the Micro Galil was tested against the M4 Colt Commando in hitting a moving pig target surrounded by four bystanders. The M4 hit the pig target with all 30 rounds in 34s while the Micro Galil fired only 23 rounds in 48s, achieving 21 hits and two grazes. The edge was given to the M4 for its accuracy, faster rate of fire, and tighter grouping.
For explosive weapons, the C4 was tested against the Semtex. In the first round of testing, the C4 destroyed a boat along with the two targets that were on it while a Semtex-laced cellphone killed its target without harming four nearby bystanders. In the second round of testing, 1 lb of each explosive was detonated in two separate wooden outhouses with the C4 generating ~270 psi and the Semtex generating ~324psi. The edge was given to the Semtex for its greater explosive force.
There was one final test comparing the hand-to-hand techniques of the two; the Commando's Krav Maga and the SEALs' Close Quarters Defense (CQD). Despite this, the results were neither shown nor factored into the simulation.
This is the sixth episode to have a tie in weapons edges.
Both warriors did not use one of their weapons in the final battle (the SEALs did not use their knives and the Israelis did not use their pistols).
This episode also marks the first time in a simulated squad battle that one combatant was able to take out two enemies at once, and is the only instance of doing so to win.
This is the closest match in season two.
The Navy Seals are the eleventh warrior of thirteen to win after scoring more kills at mid range and long range.Reenactment 22The battle begins with the Navy SEALs coming up to a power plant occupied by the Israeli Commandos. One of the Navy SEALs spots an Israeli Commando patrolling on a walkway above him and shoots him with his M4 Colt Commando. The single SEAL regroups with his squad and infiltrates the facility through a tower into the basement while the rest of the Commandos fire at them from the balcony. Inside the basement, the SEALs break off into a 2-man unit and a 3-man unit, while a 3-man unit of Commandos heads into the basement. As the two Navy SEALs make their way through the underbelly of the building, two Israeli Commandos set up an explosive trap with a glob of Semtex stuck to it and attach it to a string, which is attached to a doorknob. The two Navy SEALs come up to the door from the other side. One jiggles the door knob to ensure that it is unlocked, and the two open the door to charge in. The door pulls on the string and sets off the Semtex, instantly killing one of the Navy SEALs and throwing the other to the floor. He struggles to get up, but the other Israeli Commando seizes the opportunity and finishes him with his Micro Galil before he can get back up. Up above, the 3-man SEAL group emerges from a doorway. An Israeli Commando makes his way down a flight of stairs trying to aim his Micro Galil from the sights, but a SEAL who already has a bead on him shoots and kills him with his M4 Colt Commando. The Commando tumbles down the stairs as he is shot. The three other Commandos burst from a doorway and engage the Navy SEALs, burst-firing their Micro Galils and hitting the SEAL who falls over. The other two grab him and pull him away to safety while trying to ward off the Israeli Commandos off with gunfire. Under cover, the other two SEALs check their friend for signs of life, but the SEAL is already gone. The two remaining Navy SEALs enter another building, while the Israeli Commandos regroup and follow them through the door. Both squads emerge in different locations as the SEALs come up a flight of stairs near a turbine, while the Commandos weave their way through various machines. The Israeli Commando leader stops and signals both of his men to move forward, while on the other side, the Navy SEALs come to an open area. The SEAL leader signals for his friend to stop. He kneels down behind the turbine as the leader runs into the open area. The Commando leader comes up on the SEAL leader and tries to shoot him, but his Micro Galils jams and is rendered useless. The Navy SEAL leader runs across the open area, drawing and exchanging fire with the other two Commandos. The SEAL behind the turbine pops out and shoots a Commando in the head with his Colt Commando. The Israeli Commando next to him sees him die but shrugs it off. The leader runs down a flight of stairs, drawing the attention of the Commando. The Navy SEAL races towards him, but is surprise-attacked by the lead Israeli Commando. The Commando throws him against the turbine, and blocks the SEAL's attempt to fight back and then pulls out his Ka-Bar Knife. He slashes the SEAL's throat and stabs it into his chest. The SEAL hangs on to the Commando leader as he slumps to the floor, and the Commando pats him on the head. The two Israeli Commandos regroup then proceed to run after the last Navy SEAL, who has retreated back into the basement. Downstairs, the Navy SEAL pulls out a C4 charge and slaps it behind a set of pipes. He quickly sets up the detonator and then hides in the back and waits for the Israeli Commandos. They soon arrive and slowly move about, searching for the Navy SEAL. The Navy SEAL then gets an idea and pulls out his Sig Sauer P226. The two Israeli Commandos hear a gunshot and try to find its source, unaware that the Navy SEAL is trying to lure them towards the C4. The Israeli Commandos pass through the pipes, and the Navy SEAL activates the C4, blowing it up and sending both the Israeli Commandos and the SEAL to the floor. The Navy SEAL quickly gets up and points his Sig Sauer P226 at the two Israeli Commandos, waiting for one of them to make their move. However, it is soon apparent that both soldiers were killed by the C4 blast. He raises his gun up and gives a quick shout in victory.Winner: Navy SEALsSeason 3
Shortly after the season 2 finale, season 3 was announced on Spike.com, followed shortly after by a live Aftermath featuring new host Richard "Mack" Machowicz answering fan questions. On October 13 the show announced the start of production for the season.  Over the course of several weeks, Spike revealed the Season 3 match ups. The battle simulator (created by host Robert Daly, who replaced Max Geiger) now simulates 5,000 battles as opposed to the previous 1,000. The new format (except for Vampires vs. Zombies) is a squad on squad battle of 5 vs. 5 (reserved only for modern matches in past seasons). An average of 100 different X-factors are now factored into each simulation, each being rated on a scale from 1 to 100 (though only a few are mentioned). Season 3 premiered on July 20, 2011 at 10 pm ET.  This is the only season with no spear, punching weapon, sling, non-lethal weapon, submachine gun, flamethrower, AK-47, RPG-7, landmine, and shotgun.

Episode 23: George Washington vs. Napoleon BonaparteGeorge Washington team: Paul Suda (18th Century Weapons Expert), Wayne Lee, PhD (Professor of Military History)George Washington weapons: Colichemarde Sword, Brown Bess Flintlock Musket & Pennsylvania Long Rifle, 6 Pound CannonGeorge Washington tactics: Hybrid WarfareNapoleon Bonaparte team: Mathew Cape (19th Century Weapons Expert), Phillipe Simon (Napoleonic Historian)Napoleon Bonaparte weapons: Cavalry Saber, 1777 Charleville Musket, 8 Pound CannonNapoleon Bonaparte tactics: "Bait and Bash"

This is the first episode to test cannons.
For short-range weapons, the French cavalry saber was tested against the Colichemarde sword in eliminating three targets from horseback and on foot. Although both blades were evenly match with three kills and the cavalry saber had flexibility, the edge was given to the Colichemarde sword since it was optimized for dismounted and anti-saber combat.
For mid-range weapons, two four-man squads, one armed with four 1777 Charleville Muskets and one armed with two Brown Bess Muskets and two Pennsylvania Long Rifles, were tested against each other in eliminating four infantry and one mounted officer with five bullets each. The French squad eliminated only four infantry in 1m and 43s while the American squad eliminated all five targets and the simulated horse in 3m and 31s. Although it was very slow to reload, the edge was given to the Pennsylvania Long Rifle for its greater range and accuracy.
For long-range weapons, the French 8-Pound Cannon was tested against the American 6-Pound Cannon in eliminating 6 targets and 1 cannon at 200 yards. The French 8-Pounder achieved three kills and destroyed one cannon while the American 6-Pounder achieved only two kills and destroyed one cannon. In the Anti-Personnel Munition test, the French 8-Pounder achieved an 8/15 kill ratio with its Grapeshot while the American 6-Pounder achieved only a 4/15 kill ratio with its scattershot. The edge was given to the French 8-Pounder for its firepower and the better quality of its munitions and crew.
For military tactics, Washington's "Hybrid Warfare" strategy was compared to Napoleon's "Bait and Bash" strategy. Washington's Hybrid Warfare involved the use of hit-and-run guerrilla warfare to weaken the British army and then use the Continental Army to fight the conventional battles and sieges which successfully led to his greatest victory at the Battle of Yorktown. Napoleon's Bait and Bash involved luring an enemy into position and attacking when the conditions were perfect which was accomplished during his greatest victory at the Battle of Austerlitz where he deceived the Russo-Austrian army into thinking that he was planning to surrender by withdrawing from the Pratzen Heights and then used the cover of fog to mount a surprise attack on the weakened center of their lines. Napoleon's Bait and Bash was given the edge due to the magnitude of the French victory at Austerlitz.
George Washington is one of six warriors with no battle cry at the end.Reenactment 23The battle starts off with the Grande Armée climbing a hilltop, where Napoleon observes Washington's Continental Army relaxing near their cannon. Washington rides up and greets his troops and then notices Napoleon's troops watching them. Napoleon orders a charge as Washington's men take defensive positions and start firing. However, none of them hit their targets. One of Napoleon's men kills a Continental Soldier with his first shot, but one of Washington's men shortly follows with a hit of his own. Washington orders his sharpshooter to take out Napoleon's mounted lieutenant, which he does. Both sides then scramble for their cannons. Napoleon's army fires their cannon first and takes out another one of Washington's men, but a man of their own is decapitated as Washington's army fires their cannon. Another shot from Napoleon's cannon disables Washington's artillery. As Washington's men commence a charge, Napoleon hastily reloads and is able to fire Grapeshot from his cannon, which kills one of the chargers and knocks the other one down. Washington gets on his horse and charges towards Napoleon as his opponent does the same. Washington kills Napoleon's last man as he struggles to unsheathe his sword while Napoleon kills Washington's last man as he stumbles to his feet. Then the leaders charge at each other. The first blow knocks Washington off his horse. As he retrieves his hat, Napoleon dismounts and engages him. A brief clash of swords gives Washington an opening and he punches Bonaparte in the face, stunning him. They engage again and after a while, Washington gets the upper hand and with a thrust, pierces his sword into Napoleon's neck. As his opponent falls, Washington casually cleans his sword and stares towards the horizon.Winner: George WashingtonEpisode 24: Joan of Arc vs. William the ConquerorJoan of Arc team: Claire Dodin (15th Century Weapons Expert), Timothy Pickles (Military Historian)Joan of Arc weapons: French Arming Sword, Steel Crossbow, Siege Cannon Joan of Arc armor: Plate Armor Joan of Arc tactics: "Audacious Attack"William the Conqueror team: Jason McNeil (Medieval Combat Specialist), Stephen Morillo, PhD (Chair, Wabash College)William the Conqueror weapons: Norman Broadsword, Composite Crossbow, Torsion CatapultWilliam the Conqueror armor: Chain Mail HauberkWilliam the Conqueror tactics: Feigned Retreat

This is the first co-ed episode, as well as the first episode to test siege engines.
For short-range weapons, the arming sword was tested against the Norman broadsword in eliminating four targets and damaging one special target wearing the opposing warrior's armor. The Arming sword achieved four kills and penetrated William's armor in 35s while the Norman Broadsword achieved five kills in 21s but did not penetrate Joan's armor. The edge was given to the Norman Broadsword for its better performance at thrusting and slashing.
For mid-range weapons, the Composite Crossbow was tested against the Steel Crossbow in eliminating three defenders. The Composite Crossbow scored a 3/9 hit ratio, a 1/6 kill ratio, and an Average Reload time of 20 sec while the Steel Crossbow scored a 6/9 hit ratio, a 4/6 kill ratio, and an Average Reload time of 57s. The edge was given to the Steel Crossbow for its better accuracy.
For long-range weapons, the 12-Pound Siege Cannon was tested against the Torsion catapult in a simulated castle siege. The Siege Cannon inflicted heavy damage on a wall with its first three shots and bored a large hole into a gel dummy with the fifth shot, despite missing it with the fourth. The average reload time was 1m and 24s. The Torsion Catapult fired rocks over a castle wall and scored a 3/5 kill ratio with an average reload time of 1m and 1s. The edge was given to the Siege Cannon for its intimidation factor and ability to actually breach a castle wall.
For armour, Joan's Full Plate was tested against William's Chainmail Hauberk in encumbrance and protection capability. Joan's Full Plate only reduced her mobility by 14% and deflected a blow from the Norman Broadsword while William's Chainmail Hauberk reduced his Mobility by 27% and was pierced three times by the Arming Sword. The edge was given to Joan's Full Plate due to its greater maneuverability and the failure of William's Chainmail Hauberk.
For military tactics, Joan's "Audacity" was compared to William's "Feigned Retreat". At the Siege of Orléans, Joan snuck some of her forces into Orléans and then ordered them to regroup for a bold, frontal attack on the English Siege Post which succeeded in lifting the siege and saving Orléans from capitulation. At the Battle of Hastings, William's initial uphill attack was foiled by the Saxons forming a Shield Wall formation on top of a hill. By feigning retreats, he deceived them into breaking their shield wall formation and coming off the high ground which allowed his forces to inflict significant casualties on the pursuing Saxon forces. With their ranks thinned out and their shield wall reduced in effectiveness, William ordered his archers to fire on the rear of the Saxon army which succeeded in inflicting further casualties and mortally wounding king Harold Godwinson, clinching the victory for the Normans. The edge was given to William's "Feigned Retreat" for the greater tactical significance of his victory at Hastings.
This is the first ancient match-up that features warriors of the same region (France). However, William, the Conqueror is Norman.
Joan of Arc is the only warrior whose historical death is shown.
This is the first ancient match to feature 5 on 5, as well as the first ancient match to have a counter to tell how many combatants are remaining on each side.
Joan of Arc is the second female to take part in the fight, the only female to lead a team, and the only female to survive the final battle (an innocent woman was gunned down in a fire fight between the Yakuza and Mafia, both female spies died in KGB vs. CIA, and all the female undead in Vampires vs. Zombies were killed).
This is the third of three episodes to have a warrior with at least one gunpowder-based weapon win over one who does not.
A bonus scene not shown in the original broadcast available at Spike.com showed some additional X-factors that went into the simulator.
Joan of Arc killed 3 combatants in the simulation, earning her the most kills out of any female warrior (the female KGB agent earned 2 kills).
Joan of Arc is the twelfth warrior to win after scoring more kills at mid range and long range.Reenactment 24Joan of Arc finishes a prayer to God and resumes her siege on William's castle, assisted by four French knights while William the Conqueror defends with four Norman soldiers. Two of the Norman soldiers (one on the ramparts and one in an arrow slit) fire their composite crossbows with both missing. The French knights fire their siege cannon, damaging the wall and killing the archer behind the arrow slit. William orders his men to load and fire the torsion catapult which rains down a rock and crushes one of the French knights. The siege cannon fires another shot which breaches the castle wall and also destroys the catapult as well as knocking down the Normans who were operating it. The Norman soldier on the ramparts shoots his crossbow but only hits a siege mantlet. One of the knights fires back with his steel crossbow and kills the crossbowman. A third Norman shoots Joan with his crossbow but the bolt is unable to penetrate her plate armour. Reloading, the third Norman takes out the crossbow knight who was with Joan with a fatal shot to the eye. Joan readies the crossbow that the killed knight had been loading, and shoots the third Norman soldier, killing him. As Joan and the remaining two knights enter the castle through the breach in the wall, William's fourth and last soldier kills a third knight with a slice to the face. Joan rushes up and stabs him in the neck with her arming sword. William now stands alone in his castle and readies himself with his shield and sword. Joan and her last knight charge up to William on two separate sets of stairs. The knight reaches the top first and William engages him. He disarms the knight who then desperately grabs and takes William's shield away. William stabs the unarmed knight with his broadsword and pushes the man off the wall, just as Joan reaches his position. William and Joan fight, with William using his physicality, size, and leverage to strike Joan in the chest. Her armour absorbs the blow from his blade and is dented, but it protects her as she backs down a few steps. Clashing swords again, William tries to swing his broadsword down from overhead. Joan uses her lower position on the stairs to thrust her sword twice through William's left leg. As he collapses, he makes one last effort to kill her, but Joan grabs his arm and sword. She dispatches the Conqueror with a thrust through his chain mail and into his chest. His blade taken away by Joan and mortally wounded, William falls down from the wall, landing next to the French knight he had killed. With the castle under her command and her enemy dead, Joan gives a shout of triumph.Winner: Joan of ArcEpisode 25: U.S. Army Rangers vs. North Korean Special OpsU.S. Army Ranger team: Staff Sgt. Tim Kennedy (U.S. Army Ranger), Lt. Col. John Lock [ret] (U.S. Army Ranger/Historian)U.S. Army Ranger weapons: M4 Assault Rifle, SR-25 Sniper Rifle, Claymore MineU.S. Army Ranger hand-to-hand combat: Special Operations Combatives ProgramNorth Korean Special Ops team: Charles Joh (SWAT CDR/Tactics Specialist), Ji Jay Kim (Fmr South Korean Marine), Thomas Rix (Fmr U.S. Intelligence Officer), Grand Master Ho Jin Song (9th Degree Black Belt)North Korean Special Ops weapons: Type 68 AKM, PSL, Anti-Personnel Box MineNorth Korean Special Ops hand-to-hand combat: Hapkido and Tae-kwon-do hybrid

This is the first match-up which could potentially take place in real life due to the current relations between the two warriors' countries.
For mid-range weapons, the Type 68 was tested against the M4 Carbine in eliminating six targets inside a command post. Although both rifles completed the test in 30s, the Type 68 used only 13 shots while the M4 used all 30 shots. The edge was given to the Type 68 for its greater stopping power.
For long-range weapons, the SR-25 was tested against the PSL in eliminating six targets (3 static, 1 moving, 1 hidden, and 1 counter-sniper) during a simulated assault on a communications post. The SR-25 completed the test in 1m and 48s while the PSL completed the test in 2m and 7s. The edge was given to the SR-25 for its lighter recoil and 20-round clip capacity.
For explosive weapons, the Box Mine was tested against the M18 Claymore in eliminating a group of three targets. The box mine failed to trigger the pointman's 100G shock patch but still killed it with a potentially fatal leg amputation while the M18 Claymore killed all three targets through its shrapnel spray. The edge was given to the M18 Claymore for its higher lethality.
For close combat, the NKSOF's hapkido+taekwondo combination was compared to the Army Ranger's SOCP. The combination of hapkido and taekwondo relies on using the attacker's energy against him and attacking his pressure points as well as using circular motions and quick strikes followed by a lethal finishing blow while SOCP relies on simple, quick blunt force to do damage and make space. Both styles of fighting were deemed to be equally effective but were factored into the simulation as X-factors, not weapons.
This is the only match-up without short range weapons, the third without any melee weapons, and the third to feature hand-to-hand combat (although this was the first time it was factored into the simulation).
This episode used footage from the film Black Hawk Down, which is based on the real-life story of Rangers risking their lives to recover fallen comrades.
This is the second battle where a combatant eliminates himself and an opponent in a suicide (the third Ranger, mortally wounded by the fourth NKSOF soldier, detonates a Claymore which kills both of them).
The PSL is one of two weapons to not score any kills in the Season 3-formatted simulation.
This battle is the closest match in Deadliest Warrior history with a difference of 8 kills.
A bonus scene not shown in the original broadcast available at Spike.com showed the battlefield tactics of each warrior in the scenario of North Korea invading South Korea and the response by the US, which Mack deemed too close to call for him to give either side the edge.
The US Army Rangers are the second warrior to get the edge in explosive weapons and win (The other is the IRA).Reenactment 25Somewhere along the Korean Peninsula, a group of 5 U.S. Army Rangers are getting set to raid a Korean occupied facility, largely resembling a factory. The lead Ranger gestures with his arm, and the other Rangers copy as they march up to the facility. The Ranger sniper separates himself from the group and sets up his SR-25 rifle, surveying the area. He soon finds the enemy sniper and his spotter on a ledge, and a patrolling soldier further down. The Ranger takes aim and takes out the sniper.  He quickly changes targets to the half-aware patrolling soldier and quickly downs him. The sniper quickly vacates the area, hauling away the sniper rifle while the spotter crawls to avoid any further engagement and takes his AKM assault rifle. Meanwhile, the Ranger group marches slowly up a drainage ditch when one ranger trips a box landmine, sending him flying. Hearing the commotion, two Korean Special Ops emerge from a doorway and start firing full-auto volleys at the Rangers. The injured Ranger calls for help while another Ranger braves the shots and attempts to pull the downed man to safety. Soon, the Korean from the roof fires his PSL, cutting down the Ranger.  The downed Ranger is also shot through with the North Korean's Type 68.  Both sides continue to fire on each other until all three Koreans fall back into the facility. Seeing their chance, the Rangers begin their advance after the Koreans. Back inside, the Korean leader gestures to his friend to ambush them from the stairs while he goes on ahead. Two Rangers follow them into the building and are met with assault rifle fire. The Rangers waste no time and quickly kill the attacker, sending him over the railing. Meanwhile, the Ranger sniper comes to another part of the facility and whips off his backpack. A nearby NKSOF hears the commotion and goes to investigate. The sniper finishes rigging up a Claymore landmine, but is stopped dead in his tracks by the SOF's rifle fire. The intruding soldier walks up to confirm his kill, but the sniper, barely showing signs of life, presses the detonator. He is killed by the mine's explosion while the Korean is flung into the air and killed by the deadly shrapnel. Back inside the facility, both of the remaining Rangers are searching for the Korean leader. While cleverly hidden in the shadows, the Korean leader kills one of the Rangers when he comes too close. The Korean leader fires off one last round at the Ranger leader before emptying his gun. The Korean leader runs for the stairs as the Ranger leader spots him and takes a shot at him. The Korean leader sets his rifle down under cover from the stairs and continues his escape, while the cautious Ranger leader makes his way after him. The Korean leader sets himself hidden behind a wall and waits for the Ranger leader. The Ranger leader soon gets within range of the Korean leader as he tries to wrest his M4 away from him. The Ranger leader fights back and hits him across the face with the rifle. The Korean leader attacks with a spinning hook kick which spins the Ranger leader around and to his knees. The Korean leader tries to choke him from behind, but the Ranger leader flips him over his shoulder. Before he can do anything, the Korean leader kicks him in the head, knocking him down. The Korean leader gets to his feet as the Ranger leader does the same and tries to kick the M4 away from his hands. The Korean leader manages to hold down the rifle, but the Ranger leader counters with a headbutt. The Ranger leader stomps at the Korean leader to keep his distance and fires a rifle round into him, and the Korean leader drops dead.  The Ranger raises his fist and shouts "Rangers lead the way!" in victory.Winner: U.S. Army RangersEpisode 26: Genghis Khan vs. HannibalGenghis Khan team: Khosbayar (U.S. Marine & Mongol Weapons Expert), Timothy May, PhD (Author, "The Mongol Art of War")Genghis Khan weapons: Turko-Mongol Saber, Jida Lance, Recurve BowGenghis Khan armor: Lamellar ArmorGenghis Khan tactics: Feigned RetreatHannibal team: Bryan Forrest (Classical Weapons Specialist), Patrick Hunt, PhD (Professor of Archaeology, Stanford)Hannibal weapons: Falcata, Soliferrum, War ElephantHannibal armor: Musculata ArmorHannibal tactics: Double Envelopment

This is the first time in which a weapon that was alive was tested.
For short-range weapons, the Turko-Mongol Saber was tested against the Falcata in eliminating four targets on foot and one target on horseback. In the first test, both swords achieved four kills but in the second test on horseback, the Saber succeeded while the Falcata failed. The Saber had a swing force of 72 mph but was deemed to be slower and draining on the user's stamina while the Falcata was faster but had a swing force of only 66 mph. The edge was given to Genghis Khan's Turko-Mongol Saber for its cutting power and longer blade.
For mid-range weapons, the Jida Lance was tested against the Soliferrum in eliminating a moving target from horseback. Although the Jida was longer and more likely to achieve a kill, the edge was given to the Soliferrum since it could be used as a missile-weapon and that Hannibal would be carrying several of them.
For special weapons, the War Elephant was tested against the Recurve Bow. Suzie, not being a trained war elephant, was egged on by her trainer, Hayden Rosenaur, throughout the testing. The stomping power of an Elephant was measured at 2,045 lbs while the Recurve Bow could achieve painful, but non-lethal, penetrations into elephant hide with armor-piercing Arrows. Mac did point out that these arrows would cause pain to the elephant and likely cause it to panic and go out of control. The edge was given to the War Elephant for its massive intimidation and killing power.
For Armor, Hannibal's Musculata was tested against Genghis Khan's Steel Lamellar in protecting against the opposing warrior's sword. Both Hannibal and Genghis Khan's shields held well, with the arm behind it not encountering enough force to break bone. Both the Musculata and Lamellar sustained harmless penetration, not enough to even touch the wearer. But Hannibal's Brass helmet dented and failed at 435 psi, which meant a depressed skull fracture, while Genghis Khan's helmet was not only unscathed, but there was not enough force to damage the skull. The edge was given to Genghis Khan due to the failure of Hannibal's Helmet.
For military tactics, Hannibal's "Double Envelopment" was compared to Genghis Khan's "Feigned Retreat". At the Battle of Cannae, Hannibal tempted the Roman army into specifically attacking the center of his army by deploying in a formation that had strong flanks and a thin, weak center that was curved outward. The Roman Infantry force of 70,000 took the bait by focusing all of their efforts onto the center until they were trapped in a double-envelopment and slaughtered down to only a handful of survivors. At the Battle of Kalka River, the Mongols, using only a small force of 2,000 Mongolian cavalry, agitated a sizable force of 30,000 Rus' and Kipchak's into attacking them and kept them focused on trying to pursue them by constantly launching hit-and-run attacks and denying them the opportunity for a battle. The pursuit lasted for 9 days and stretched for 200 miles which left the Rus' and Kipchak's disorganized, tired, and blindly determined which led to them being trapped and defeated, by a waiting army of 18,000 Mongolians, in an ambush on the banks of the Kalka River. The edge was given to Genghis Khan for his tactical ability in luring away and weakening the enemy. However, while Khan was given the edge, in reality he was not even present at the Battle of the Kalka River.
This is the only reality based episode in season 3 that did not feature any black powder weapons.
This is the second episode not to feature a long-range category (although the Soliferrum and the Recurve Bow are projectile weapons in the mid and special weapons categories.)
Percentage wise, Hannibal's Soliferrum is the most dominating weapon in any category of season 3.
Genghis Khan is the only warrior of season 3 to win after getting the battle field tactics edge.
The war elephant is the sixteenth weapon to be given the edge and score fewer kills than the opposing weapon.
Despite being more effective than Hannibal's bronze-rimmed wooden shield, Genghis Khan's steel shield had a higher armor failure rate. This could be due to the fact that Genghis Khan killed mostly by striking the brass helmet first.
A bonus clip not in the original broadcast shows the elephant taking down several targets while charging at a speed of 24 mph, as well as Khosbayar attempting to stop a simulated elephant from charging with fire arrows.Reenactment 26The battle starts with Genghis Khan, who is mounted on horseback, and 4 of his Mongol soldiers out walking on a hillside. They soon hear a strange noise and see Hannibal, who is mounted upon a war elephant and being accompanied by 4 Carthaginians: 3 foot soldiers and a single horseman. Hannibal soon makes visual contact with Genghis, and Genghis orders his men to load their bow and arrows. They aim upwards and fire, one which comes down in Hannibal's shield, and another which sticks in an unlucky Carthaginian. In retaliation, Hannibal orders his horseman to ride on and attack with Soliferrums. As he charges, one Mongol breaks from the group and charges into battle with his Jida Lance, only to be struck down by one of the Soliferrums. Khan rides off and soon returns the favor to the Carthaginian with his own Jida Lance, which one of his men hands to him. Back on the other side of the hill, Hannibal dismounts from his elephant and prods him on with a Soliferrum to charge at the Mongolians. The three Mongolians kneel down and shoot at the elephant with their recurve bow and arrows, but soon retreat as the elephant charges in, trampling one Mongolian. The Mongolians regroup and continue assaulting the elephant with arrows, firing arrows into its hide and head, and driving it away from the battlefield. Elsewhere, Khan rides in on his war horse and strikes down a Carthaginian soldier with his Turko-Mongol Saber. Meanwhile, one of the Carthaginians charges at the two remaining Mongolians, catching one's attention by throwing a Soliferrum at his head. The iron javelin is deflected by the Mongolian's shield and both men turn to face the Carthaginian. One tries to hack at him with a Mongol saber, but he deflects the blow and stabs him through his leather lamellar with his Falcata. He then tries to strike at the last Mongol's legs, but the Mongol jumps back and slashes his leg. While he is kneeling, the Mongol quickly follows up with a slash to the face, killing the Carthaginian. His victory is short-lived, however, as Hannibal comes up from behind and impales him through the chest with his Falcata. Genghis Khan soon spots Hannibal again and rides up toward him, throwing away his Mongol bow and dismounting. He walks up to him, measuring him up, and then gives a war cry while drawing his saber. Both men clash swords, which are caught by both shields. Hannibal goes for a vertical head shot with his Falcata, but Genghis shakes off the blow and slashes Hannibal across the thigh. Hannibal goes for a horizontal slash, but Genghis ducks under the sword and hits Hannibal's shield out of his hands. Tired and desperate, Hannibal deflects blows from the saber and goes for a thrust strike with the falcata, but it fails to pass through the steel lamellar armor. Enraged, Genghis counters with two consecutive head shots to Hannibal's brass helmet, severely denting it and knocking Hannibal dizzy. Genghis Khan then spins around and delivers the final strike, slashing Hannibal across the neck and cutting neck arteries. Hannibal falls down dead as The Great Khan gives a victorious shout.Winner: Genghis KhanEpisode 27: Saddam Hussein vs. Pol PotSaddam Hussein team: Sabah Khodada (Former Iraqi Army General), Calvin Bondley (Saddam Weapons Specialist), Lt. Col. Rick Francona [ret] (Former U.S.A.F. & C.I.A. Agent)Saddam Hussein weapons: Combat Knife, Browning Semi-Automatic Pistol, RPK Light Machine Gun, RGD-5 GrenadePol Pot team: Jonathan Khan (Pol Pot Weapons Expert), Kilong Ung (Cambodian Genocide Survivor)Pol Pot weapons: Cane Knife, Tokarev TT-33, RPD Light Machine Gun, Chinese Stick Grenade

This is the first episode to use multiple weapons in a single test.
For short-range weapons, the combat knife was tested against the cane knife in eliminating two targets. The combat knife killed both targets with a stabbing speed of 40 mph while the cane knife had a slashing speed of 45 mph but failed to kill the second target. The edge was given to the combat knife for its flexibility and portability.
For mid-range weapons, the Browning Hi-Power was tested against the TT-33 in eliminating two targets at phase 3 of the first test. Although the TT-33 finished the test at 2:02, the edge was given to the Browning Hi-Power for its 13-round capacity and heavier caliber.
For long-range weapons, the RPK was tested against the RPD in eliminating a missed target in phase 1 of the first test, five targets in phase 2 of the same test, and eliminating two targets in a motorcade ambush with 80 rounds. During the first test, the RPK completed Phase 1 at 0:09 and Phase 2 at 1:20, but had to be reloaded, while the RPD completed Phase 1 at 0:12 and Phase 2 at 1:49. During the Motorcade Ambush test, the RPK completed with 59s while the RPD completed with 46s. The edge was given to the RPD for its 100-round Drum Magazine.
For explosive weapons, the RGD-5 grenade was tested against the Chinese Stick Grenade in eliminating four targets at phase 1 of the first test. Although both Grenades only killed three targets, the edge was given to the Chinese Stick Grenade for its higher explosive payload and lower risk of rolling off-target.
Sabah Khodada, who served under Saddam Hussein until he was imprisoned for insubordination, is the first expert of the series unable to speak English, necessitating fellow expert Rick Francona to translate for him. He is also the only expert to have personally known one of the named warriors.
This is the only episode in season 3 where both warriors use more than 3 weapons.
This is the second episode in which a warrior was able to take out two opponents in the simulation at once with an explosion, the first being Navy Seal vs Israeli Commando.
The RPD Light Machine Gun is one of two weapons to not score any kills in the Season 3-formatted simulation.
Despite the results being close, this is the most lopsided match-up of season 3.
Saddam Hussein is the thirteenth warrior of thirteen to win after scoring more kills at mid range and long range.
The RPD Light Machine Gun is the seventeenth weapon to get the edge and score fewer kills than the opposing weapon.
A bonus clip showcases each dictator's preferred method of torture: Pol Pot's electric shock and Saddam Hussein's chemical bath.Reenactment 27Inside a war-torn Iraqi city, Saddam Hussein sits in his office looking over paperwork while 3 of his Republican Guard soldiers stand watch outside his building and 1 is inside protecting him. Outside, 4 armed Khmer Rouge guerrillas run in, hiding behind building and pillar cover. One Khmer Rouge takes out his stick grenade and lobs it at the checkpoint's guardhouse. The grenade explodes, killing two soldiers. Both Hussein and his bodyguard are alerted to explosion as they both exit the office to see the commotion. Back outside, a firefight starts between the only Republican Guard soldier unscathed by the grenade and the Khmer Rouge rebels. The Iraqi soldier takes his RGD-5 grenade and lobs it to the pillars, killing one Cambodian insurgent and stunning another to his knees. Both Hussein and his bodyguard burst from a second-story balcony and join the fray, shooting and killing the guerrilla before he can get back to his feet. The bodyguard stops for a minute to reload a fresh magazine into his RPK machine gun as Pol Pot enters the scene and takes the dead rebel's RPD machine gun and fires at the balcony. Under heavy fire and outgunned, Saddam calls for a retreat as he, his bodyguard, and the last checkpoint guard fall back inside the building. Pol Pot and his remaining soldiers cross the street and are about to raid the building when Saddam's motorcade comes veering around the corner, with a worried Saddam telling the driver to hurry. Pol Pot and two of his men quickly head him off and fire on the automobile, with Pol Pot's Tokarev shooting the driver in the face and killing him, making Saddam very angry. The Khmer Rouge forces dive out of the way as the motorcade speeds ahead uncontrollably and crashes into the side of a house. Saddam and his bodyguard quickly exit the vehicle as one Khmer Rouge rebel fires at the car with his RPD, shooting the gas tank and causing the motorcade to explode. The Khmer Rouge guerrilla moves in with his gun raised, inspecting the flaming wreckage to see the driver dead. The last Republican Guard pops out of the doorway of the building he entered and fires at the rebel, forcing him to regroup behind cover with Pol Pot and the other rebel, who return fire. The RPD guerrilla stands up to fire at the guard, but is shot down by Saddam who emerges from the second-story window, firing his Browning pistol. Saddam's bodyguard finishes the last of his RPK ammo and quickly draws his Browning while withdrawing into the safety of the building. Pol Pot and his remaining soldier then move on to the building, Tokarevs at the ready with Pol Pot quickly pointing his upward and shooting. In the alley behind the building, the bodyguard waits for the Khmer Rouge forces to show themselves. The Khmer Rouge rebel soon enters the alley and engages the bodyguard, but Pol Pot quickly puts him down from behind with a strike from his cane knife. Pot then motions for the rebel to move into the house while Pot frees his knife from the dead guard's back. The rebel moves into the house, but sees nothing. He motions for Pol Pot to come in, but is soon attacked by Saddam, who stabs his combat knife through the front of his chest. Pol Pot empties the rest of his Tokarev ammo as Saddam drags the dead rebel inside. He drops his Tokarev on the ground and cautiously enters the building. Through a window, he sees Saddam standing behind a wall with only his left arm visible. Pol Pot makes his move and rounds the corner, swinging his cane knife into the dictator's neck. However, he realizes too late he has cut into his dead comrade, wearing Saddam's jacket. The real Hussein comes to his side, wearing an undershirt, raises his Browning to Pol Pot's head, saying "This is a weapon" in Arabic, and pulls the trigger. After Pol Pot drops out of view, Saddam raises his gun in the air and shouts "Allāhu Akbar!" (God is great) in victory.Winner: Saddam HusseinEpisode 28: Theodore Roosevelt vs. Lawrence of ArabiaTheodore Roosevelt Team: Gsgt. Quay Terry [ret] (United States Marine Corps), Gary Harper (Military Historian/Armorer)Theodore Roosevelt Weapons: Bowie Hunter, 1896 Krag Carbine, Gatling GunTheodore Roosevelt Tactics: "Suppress & Slaughter"Lawrence of Arabia Team: Richard Reid (British Firearms Specialist), Gavin Scott (T. E. Lawrence Historian)Lawrence of Arabia Weapons: Jambiya Dagger, Short Magazine Lee–Enfield Rifle, Vickers Machine GunLawrence of Arabia Tactics: "Phantom Army"

This is the first episode to test rapid fire crew-served weapons.
For short-range weapons, the bowie hunter was tested against the jambiya in eliminating two targets. The bowie hunter only killed one target and had an impact force of 42 mph while the jambiya killed both targets and had an impact force of 51 mph. The edge was given to the jambiya for its larger blade.
For mid-range weapons, the SMLE was tested against the Springfield 1896 Krag in velocity, damage, recoil performance, and in eliminating 8 targets (3 static, 3 moving, and 2 pop-up) with 20 rounds during a simulated assault. In the performance test, the Springfield Krag had a muzzle velocity of 1958 fps, created a damage cavity of 5-in, and imparted a recoil force of 9 lbs while the SMLE had a muzzle velocity of 2592 fps, created a damage cavity of 5.5-in, and imparted a recoil force of 37 lbs. During the assault test, the Springfield Krag scored an 8/8 kill ratio and a 16/20 hit ratio of 80% in 2:26 while the SMLE scored a 7/8 kill ratio and a 14/20 hit ratio of 70% in 2:15. Although the Springfield Krag was lighter and more accurate and the SMLE was stronger, faster to reload, and could hold twice as many rounds, both weapons were deemed to be even, resulting in a draw.
For long-range weapons, the Gatling gun was tested against the Vickers machine gun in eliminating 18 targets with 250 rounds. The Gatling gun scored a 13/18 kill ratio in 1:11 while the Vickers scored a 14/18 kill ratio in 1:41 but jammed once. The edge was given to the Gatling gun for its faster rate of fire and resistance to jamming.
For military tactics, Roosevelt's Charge, aka "Suppress and Slaughter" was compared to Lawrence's Hit Hard and Vanish, aka "Phantom Army". At the battle of San Juan Hill, the Rough Riders came under artillery and infantry fire and Roosevelt responded by ordering his Gatling gun detachment to provide suppressing fire which allowed his troops to charge up and take the San Juan and Kettle hill positions. At the Battle of Aqaba, Lawrence used several raids on the train routes north of the position to trick the Turkish army into thinking he was going to attack Damascus. The Turks took the bait by launching a pursuit against the Bedouin raiders which left only a battalion to defend Aqaba and allowed Lawrence to take the strategic port city after a successful attack. The edge was given to Lawrence for his tactical ability in deceiving and outmaneuvering the enemy.
Lawrence of Arabia is the first warrior whose team members are not of the same nationality (Lawrence was a Leftenant Colonel in the British Army who fought with Hashemite Arabs)
This is the eighth episode to have a tie in weapons edges.
Theodore Roosevelt is only the second warrior to win with only one edge between all categories (the other was the Shaolin Monk).
This is the only episode in season 3 to reveal the amount of kills for a weapon (10,316 kills for the Gatling gun and 7,544 kills for the Vickers machine gun).
A bonus scene featuring the Battlefield Experience X-Factor which was only mentioned in the original broadcast is available at Spike.com.Reenactment 28The battle begins on a hillside, where Roosevelt and 4 of his Rough Riders are congregating with each other. Roosevelt looks up the hill to suddenly see Lawrence in full desert garb coming over the hill. Roosevelt distances himself slightly to measure up the stranger when Lawrence suddenly motions with his hand, summoning his Bedouin tribesmen carrying weapons and machine gun parts. Roosevelt calls for his men to prepare the Gatling Gun as Lawrence and his men prepare the Vickers machine gun and fire their SMLE rifles. Roosevelt takes aim and fires with his Krag rifle as the Rough Riders cart out their Gatling gun and aim it up the hill. The Vickers gunner opens fire on the Rough Riders, killing one of the gunners as he tries to run behind the Gatling for cover.  The Gatling crew begins to crank out fire as Roosevelt and the other Rough Riders fire their Krag rifles. Eventually, one of Lawrence's men is taken by the gunfire as the Vickers gun suddenly jams.  Outgunned by the Gatling, Lawrence orders his men to retreat back down the hill. Seeing their opponents flee back down the hill, Roosevelt orders the Gatling gunner to cease fire as the two riflemen run up the hill, inspecting the machine gun site. One of the riflemen waves his hand, signaling "All Clear". Meanwhile, Lawrence of Arabia and his men make their way up the other side of Colonel Roosevelt's position, unbeknownst to him and the gunner. Lawrence takes out a bundle of dynamite and lights the fuse. The blast rocks the hillside as Roosevelt and the gunner quickly turn the Gatling towards the area of the blast. While their backs are turned, a Bedouin rebel shoots out the gunner.  Roosevelt turns around and aims his Krag as the other two riflemen regroup with him, taking aim at the Bedouin. Behind them, another Bedouin charges over the hill, but is shot down as one of the riflemen mounts the Gatling, shooting him before he even comes within range. The other Bedouin aims his SMLE and fires, hitting Roosevelt in the left arm and forcing him to kneel. One of the Rough Riders takes aim and kills the Bedouin while he is still exposed.  The other Rough Rider helps Roosevelt to his feet, with Roosevelt assuring him that he's okay. Before they come to their senses, Lawrence fires his SMLE, shooting a Rough Rider in the back of the head.  Roosevelt then regains his senses and shoots the Bedouin across the hill. Both men now give chase after Lawrence of Arabia, attempting to reload their rifles. Lawrence jumps down into a trench as the pursuing rifleman reloads his Krag. The rifleman slowly makes his way down the trench, aiming his rifle in front of him when Lawrence comes around the corner, jambiya knife in hand. The rifleman tries to hit Lawrence with the stock of the rifle, but Lawrence ducks and counters with a slash to the Rider's shoulder, knocking off his hat. Angered, the Rough Rider attempts to draw his knife, but Lawrence follows up with two slashes to the chest, killing him.  Behind him, Roosevelt inhales deeply and draws his Bowie Hunter knife, preparing to show down with Lawrence. Lawrence takes a step forward and swings, causing Roosevelt to shout and lunge forward. Lawrence jumps back and counters with two slashes. Roosevelt jumps back and feints a slash, following up with a punch to Lawrence's face. While he is still stunned, Roosevelt grabs Lawrence's keffiyeh and wraps it around his knife-arm and stabs Lawrence in the stomach.  Roosevelt pulls out the knife and Lawrence falls down dead. He then raises his blood-covered Bowie knife in the air and yells in victory.Winner: Theodore RooseveltEpisode 29: Ivan the Terrible vs. Hernán CortésIvan the Terrible Team: Vladimir Orlov (Russian Special Forces Trainer), Andrew Jenks, PhD (Professor of Russian Studies)Ivan the Terrible Weapons: Sablia, Bardiche, PishcalIvan the Terrible Armor: Plated mail, Fluted helmetHernán Cortés Team: Jason Heck (16th Century Weapons Expert), Kyle Lopez (Spanish Colonial Expert)Hernán Cortés Weapons: Espada ropera, Alabarda, ArquebusHernán Cortés Armor: Steel Breastplate, Tassets, Morion helmet

 This is the first episode to feature matchlock rifles, disproving the myth of their inaccuracy.
 For short-range weapons, the sablia was tested against the espada ropera in slashing, thrusting, and horseback performance. The sablia passed both tests while the espada ropera cut a pig in half but failed on horseback. The edge was given for the sablia for its performance on horseback.
 For mid-range weapons, the bardiche was tested against the alabarda in eliminating a gel torso and an opponent on horseback. The bardiche completely destroyed the gel torso but failed to take out the rider while the alabarda eliminated both the gel torso and the rider. The edge was given the alabarda for its lighter weight, flexibility, and reach.
 For long-range weapons, the arquebus was tested against the pishcal in eliminating 3 targets and piercing the opposing warrior's armor. Although both weapons killed all three targets with only two shots and pierced the opposing warrior's armor, the edge was given to the pishcal for its faster reload, better accuracy and its stabilizing mount (the arquebus used a stave to stabilize the gun's barrel as the pischal used the bardiche; one of Mack's notes on this was that you had a weapon already prepared for use once the opponent was within a range that made the gun useless.)
 For armor, Cortés' steel cuirass was compared to Ivan's plated mail in protection capability. Although both suits could be pierced by the opponent's long-range weapon, the edge was given to Cortés' steel cuirass for better resistance against thrusting and slashing blows.
 This is the second episode to have a neutral nonparticipant both be in and die in the simulation, the first simulation to use slow motion, and the first time a warrior forcibly sacrifices one of his men (Ivan the Terrible uses him as a human shield).
 Hernán Cortés is tied with the Spetsnaz leader and Crazy Horse for most humans killed in the final battle with 4 kills.
A bonus clip showcases each conqueror's preferred method of torture: Ivan's quartering and Cortés' garrotte.Reenactment 29The battle begins in a field with Ivan the Terrible knelt in a silent prayer, surrounded by 2 Oprichniki horsemen and 2 streltsy. He looks toward the sky, and then looks down to a bloodied prisoner tied to two horses, who is about to be pulled apart. Ivan smirks at the condemned as he rises from his kneeling position. Elsewhere, Hernan Cortés and 4 of his Conquistadors are out for a ride when Cortés suddenly spots the group of men. Ivan nods to one of the hooded Oprichniki and the horsemen begin to pull. Ivan laughs at the prisoner's pain as Cortés, who has dismounted from horseback, shows concern and signals for his men to take position with their Arquebuses. Ivan immediately stops laughing when he notices the group of men aiming their firearms at his death squad. Cortés gives the signal with his sword and the conquistadors open fire. Before the gunmen fire, Ivan quickly grabs one of his soldiers and pulls him in front of him. The soldier is killed by the assault of bullets but the Tsar is only knocked to the ground.  As the Spanish Soldiers hurry to reload their Arquebuses, Ivan gets back to his feet and runs over to one of the horses, pulling the Oprichnik down. Meanwhile, the last Russian soldier sets up his Bardiche as a mount for his Pischal, shooting and killing one of the Spaniards who shot the other soldier.  Ivan draws his Sablia and rides on, pulling the prisoner in half and dragging the torso behind him. The remaining soldier and the dismounted Oprichnik charge the Spaniards. The conquistadors calmly hold their ground as one of the Spaniards takes an Alabarda from his horse and hands it to Cortés. As the Conquistadors continue to reload, Ivan rides up and slashes one of them in the face, killing him instantly.  He then changes course and rides to a retreating conquistador who has his Espada Ropera drawn and slashes him in the back of the neck, also killing him. Elsewhere, the mounted Oprichnik draws his Sablia and rides towards Cortés, who is still armed with his Alabarda. Cortés holds his ground and reaches with the poleaxe, pulling the hooded man down from horseback. Cortés then raises the pike end and brings it down into the Oprichnik's face.  The last Oprichnik charges at Cortés with his saber drawn. Cortés lifts the halberd from the dead man's hood, parrying the sword and countering with a thrust attack, which impales the Oprichnik through the chest.  Cortés then calls for his horse, which the last mounted conquistador brings to him. The last conquistador then rides on with his sword drawn. However, he is shot off his horse by the last Russian soldier, who then finishes him off with a strike to the midsection with his Bardiche while he is still down. Cortés then charges forth on his horse, slashing the soldier in the face with his Espada Ropera as he lifts the heavy Bardiche for a strike.  Ivan then spots Cortés and charges at him, sword raised. Ivan slashes Cortés as he rides by, but Cortés is unfazed as the saber bounces off his steel breastplate. After the charge is finished, Ivan notices that Cortés managed to cut him on his right cheek. Ivan gleefully licks the blood from his finger, then gives a shout as he and Cortés charge each other, both men shouting. As the warriors ride past each other, Cortés ducks under Ivan's wild swing and thrusts his sword forward, puncturing Ivan's neck. Ivan slumps down in his saddle as he quickly bleeds out, then falls face down from his horse to the ground.  Hernán Cortés then walks up to the fallen Tsar, holding his right breast where the sword struck him and kicks Ivan to make sure that he's dead. Seeing no movement, Cortés holds his sword up and kneels down, taking his money pouch and finding gold coins, smiling at his spoils. Cortés stands up and raises his sword, shouting "¡Gloria!" (Glory!) in victory.Winner: Hernán CortésEpisode 30: Crazy Horse vs. Pancho VillaCrazy Horse Team: Moses Brings Plenty (Lakota Tribesman/Firearms Expert), Delano "Blu" Eagle (Fmr U.S. Marine/Lakota Tribesman)Crazy Horse Weapons: Inyankapemni Club, 1873 Colt, 1860 Henry Repeating RifleCrazy Horse Tactics: Hit and RunPancho Villa Team: Fernando Vazquez (Expert Marksman/Horseman), Santiago Villalobos (Villa Folklore Historian)Pancho Villa Weapons: Bolo Knife, Colt Bisley, 1894 Winchester Repeating RiflePancho Villa Tactics: El Golpe Terrifico

For short-range weapons, the Inyankapemni club was tested against the bolo knife in damaging a gel torso in 15 secs. The Inyankapemni caused a depressed skull fracture and had a swing force of 104 mph but broke during the test while the bolo knife achieved a decapitation. The edge was given to the bolo knife for its durability and flexibility.
For mid-range weapons, the Colt Bisley was tested against the 1873 Colt in ballistics performance and eliminating five targets with six rounds without hitting a horse. The Colt Bisley had a muzzle velocity of 1168 fps while the Colt 1873 had a muzzle velocity of 997 fps but caused more internal damage. In the second test, both guns had a 5/6 hit ratio with the 1873 Colt scoring a 3/5 kill ratio in 21s to the Colt Bisley's 2/5 kill ratio in 17s. The edge was given to the 1873 Colt for its longer barrel and higher damage.
For long-range weapons, the 1860 Henry was tested against the 1894 Winchester in eliminating four targets at 50 yards and five targets on horseback. In the first test, the 1860 Henry scored a 40% hit ratio and 2 kills in 1:15 but jammed once while the 1894 Winchester scored a 40% hit ratio and 1 kill in 48s. In the second test, both weapons scored a 3/5 hit ratio with 2 kills to the 1860 Henry and 1 kill to the 1894 Winchester. The edge was given to the 1894 Winchester since it was a newer and more reliable rifle.
For military tactics, Pancho Villa's "Ferocious Blow" was compared to Crazy Horse's "Hit and Run". At the 2nd Battle of Torreón, Pancho began his attack with an infantry advance which was a failure that resulted in them being counter-attacked and bombarded by a numerically superior force of 10,000 Federale soldiers. Pancho's villistas soon redoubled their efforts by moving in at night and besieging the position that the artillery fire came from. At the Battle of Rosebud Creek, General Crook attempted to array his cavalry in a single line on the high ground which Crazy Horse anticipated and responded to with hit and run raids. Due to a communications breakdown and inability to hit the attacking Sioux/Cheyenne raiders, Crazy Horse launched a frontal attack while Crook's forces were reloading and managed to outflank and overrun them, forcing General Crook to withdraw and resulting in the annihilation of Custer's 7th Cavalry at the Little Bighorn. The edge was given to Crazy Horse for his tactical abilities in using the terrain to his advantage, outmaneuvering the enemy, and using their numbers and inability to coordinate and resupply against them.
This is the first episode of season 3 to show a weapon that did not go into the simulation (Crazy Horse's self bow.)  Although, while Crazy Horse had the bow in the simulation, he never used it.
Crazy Horse is tied with the Spetznaz leader and Hernán Cortés for most human kills in a simulation (four) and is the only warrior to lose the match while doing this.Reenactment 30The battle starts under a tree at Pancho Villa's campsite, where 4 Villistas are inspecting their weapons and Pancho slicing and eating a pomegranate with his bolo knife. Not far away, Crazy Horse and 4 Lakota come over the hill, himself and two other Lakota mounted on horseback. Villa and his Villistas look over to the hill just as Crazy Horse and his men give loud war whoops. Sensing a fight, Pancho orders his men to arm up as he sheaths his bolo. As the Lakotas charge forth firing their repeating Henry rifles, the Villistas take defensive positions and return fire with their repeating Winchester rifles. As one Villistas rides into the middle of the field, another takes aim with his Colt Bisley and fires, killing one of the other mounted Lakota who slumps down in his saddle. As the Villista rides towards the Lakota, he is fatally shot by Crazy Horse using his Henry rifle, and falls down from his horse. The Villa Revolutionaries continue to fire until the Lakota come too close for comfort. The Mexicans retreat from their campsite for better cover, with Villa mounting a horse and escaping. Crazy Horse regroups with his fellow men and give celebratory war whoops to each other. The remaining 4 Native Americans then decide to split up into two groups: Crazy Horse and the other mounted Lakota on horseback, and the other two Lakota on foot. An unknown amount of time passes as seen by clouds moving overhead. In a nearby field, Crazy Horse and his fellow brave have dismounted and are navigating the tall grass with rifles in hand. The other Lakota suddenly steps on a large twig, giving their position to the other 2 Villistas. Behind tree cover, one of the Villistas fires his Winchester and shoots the other Lakota in the head. Crazy Horse ducks down and disappears into the grass. The Villistas cautiously wait for Crazy Horse to make his move, with one of them shooting into the grass with his Bisley. The Lakota chief, moving and camouflaged, reappears and aims his Colt, shooting the Villista with the Winchester in the eye. The other Villista fires his Bisley at the Lakota chief as he makes a run for his life. Crazy Horse quickly holsters his revolver and gives chase. Meanwhile, in the forest, the natives follow Pancho and the last Villista, cornering them behind trees. Both revolutionaries pull out their Colt Bisleys and fire, shooting one of the natives as he rises from cover and draws his revolver. While Pancho has a shootout with the other native, the other revolutionary attempts to reload his gun, only to be shot in the neck by Crazy Horse who appears right behind the two Mexicans. Crazy Horse draws a bead on Pancho but discovers he has depleted the last of his Colt ammo and readies his war club, preparing to get the drop on the Mexican general. Pancho stops firing at the last Lakota brave as he sees his last Villista run up behind him and run him through with his bolo knife. The Villista then runs past Villa, and noticing Crazy Horse, charges at him. He is quickly put down by a blow to the head from Crazy Horse's war club. As the Lakota chief advances at the Mexican general, Pancho attempts to fire his revolver which has run out of ammo. Crazy Horse brings the club down on his left shoulder, causing him to shout in pain. Pancho Villa then drops his guns and draws his bolo knife. After each swings and misses, Pancho closes and cuts Crazy Horse across the chest. The Lakota brave goes down and Villa goes in for an overhead cut, which is blocked by Crazy Horse holding the club out in front of him. The club breaks, and Crazy Horse forces Pancho off with his leg. He distracts Pancho Villa by throwing the stone end of the club at Pancho's face and with Pancho stunned, Crazy Horse gets to his feet and tries to stab him with the splintered handle. Pancho grabs Crazy Horse by the hand and stops him, just before stabbing the chief in the chest. As Crazy Horse slumps down, Pancho removes his knife in a slashing motion and adds a cut to the neck of his opponent. Pancho then stands up and raises his arms, shouting triumphantly "¡Victoria!" (Victory!).Winner: Pancho VillaEpisode 31: French Foreign Legion vs. GurkhasFrench Foreign Legion Team: Cpl. Nick Hughes [ret] (FFL Recon Diver/Commando), Geoff Wawro, PhD (French Foreign Legion Historian)French Foreign Legion Weapons: Camillus, MAS-36 Rifle, Browning Automatic RifleFrench Foreign Legion Tactics: Active DefenseGurkha Team: Sgt. Rastra Rai [ret] (20-Year Gurkha Soldier), Lt. John Conlin [ret] (Former Gurkha Commander)Gurkha Weapons: Kukri, Enfield No. 4 Rifle, Bren Light Machine Gun Gurkha Tactics: Improvised Ambush

This is the first episode to feature warriors fighting under a country other than their native one (the Gurkhas fight for the United Kingdom and the Legion is open to foreigners who want to serve France).
For short-range weapons, the kukri was tested against the camillus in eliminating 3 targets (2 guards, 1 pop-up). Although both weapons scored 3 kills with the camillus having a higher strike force of 81 mph to the kukri's 59 mph, the edge was given to the kukri for its larger blade.
For mid-range weapons, the MAS-36 was tested against the Lee–Enfield No.4 in terminal ballistics and in eliminating 5 targets (3 moving, 2 static) with 20 rounds. In the first test, the MAS-36 had a muzzle velocity of 2647fps compared to 2417fps for the Lee–Enfield No.4. In the second test, both rifles had a 5/5 kill ratio with the Lee–Enfield No.4 scoring a 13/20 hit ratio in 2:07 and the MAS-36 scoring a 14/20 hit ratio in 2:54. The edge was given to the Lee–Enfield No.4 for its faster reload and longer range.
For long-range weapons, the BAR was tested against the Bren in eliminating 3 targets at 100, 50, and 25 yards. The BAR completed the test in 58s while the Bren completed the test in 53s but jammed once. The edge was given to the BAR for its mechanical reliability, lighter weight, smaller recoil, and longer range.
The rate of fatigue for the French Foreign Legion was 10.9%, and 5.02% for the Gurkhas.  This was factored in due to the legendary regimens of each warrior. The Legionaries brutally train in the desert, complete with severe corporal punishment and the world's highest training mortality rate. The Gurkhas are physiologically less susceptible to fatigue due to the high altitude mountainous environment in which they live, strengthening their legs from incessant high incline traversal and lessening their dependence on oxygen after generations of exposure to the thin mountain air.
Even though both fighting forces still exist today, this match puts them both in World War II due to their reputation during that period.
This is the second match-up where the opponents are contemporaneous allies (they both fought for the Allies during World War II).
The French Foreign Legion is the second warrior group composed of different nationalities.
A bonus clip available on Spike.com showcases additional X-Factors that went into the simulator.Reenactment 31The battle begins with 5 relaxed French Foreign Legionnaires milling about at their campsite. Not far away, a squad of 5 Gurkhas are preparing an ambush. A legionnaire sentry relieves his fellow guardsman as the lead Gurkha cuts a hole in the legion's barbed wire fence using wire snips. The sentry watches along the perimeter of the camp site, unaware of the Gurkhas' position. A Gurkha takes aim with his Lee–Enfield No. 4 and fires, alerting the rest of the legion. The legion immediately scramble for defensive positions, firing their MAS-36 rifles and BAR machine guns while the Gurkhas fire back with their Lee–Enfields and Bren machine guns. As his position begins to crumble, the sentry attempts to leave his sandbag cover, but is shot down in the crossfire.  An African legionnaire quickly re-cocks his bolt action MAS and fires, killing a Gurkha.  He quickly fires off one more shot before running back for cover behind sandbags. As the rest of the small legion falls back, the Gurkhas start to advance, taking position in front of the sandbags and continuing to lay down covering fire as two Gurkhas run up through the camp, dodging small artillery fire and jumping over the barbed wire barricade. A Gurkha jumps out of cover and briefly stops to clear a jam in his Bren machine gun, but is shot by a legionnaire who gets up from his position and fires his BAR at the Gurkha.  As soon as he's visible, a Gurkha behind a nearby tree shoots him in the head with his Lee–Enfield rifle. While the other Gurkhas inspect the tents for any other legionnaires, the African legionnaire pops out of cover behind sandbags and shoots one of the wandering Gurkhas in the head.  The other Gurkha sniper quickly retaliates by shooting him in the head while he's still standing.  As the Gurkhas draw closer to the 2 remaining legionnaires, the lead legionnaire jumps out of cover and fires his MAS at the lead Gurkha. The Gurkha takes cover behind a tent as the 2 legionnaires unload the rest of their ammo at the retreating Gurkhas. As they retreat, the lead Gurkha gestures to his partner to split up as the 2 legionnaires come charging at them. Nearby, the other legionnaire cautiously searches for his prey, aiming his rifle. The lead Gurkha sneaks up behind him and brings his kukri blade down, cutting through the legionnaire's kepi and into his skull.  The other Gurkha, armed with his kukri, is also brought down from behind as the lead legionnaire grabs him from behind and stabs him in the neck with his Callimus knife. The two leaders soon confront each other near a hillside, knives in hand as a knife fight showdown ensues. Both leaders step to each other, daring the other to attack. As soon as they come closer to each other, they begin to swing at each other, with the Gurkha scoring the first strike with a backhanded cut across the left cheek. The Gurkha goes in for a follow-up strike, but the legionnaire counters with a strike across the right cheek that causes the Gurkha to stumble down the hillside. As soon as he regains his balance, the legionnaire goes in for a strike and follows up with a thrust. The Gurkha recovers and moves out of the way, causing the legionnaire's Callimus to get stuck in a log that was behind the Gurkha. As the legionnaire tries to free his knife, the Gurkha takes the opportunity to slash his opponent diagonally across the back and kick him. The legionnaire frees his knife and swings his knife 180 degrees, causing the Gurkha to jump back. The Gurkha slashes the legionnaire twice across the face. The legionnaire goes in for a thrust attack in desperation, but the Gurkha grabs him arm and stops him. He then swings his knife, slashing through the legionnaire's throat.  As the legionnaire lies on the ground drawing his last breath, the Gurkha raises his arms and bloodied kukri into the air, shouting "Ayo Gurkhali!" (The Gurkhas are here!) in victory.Winner: GurkhasEpisode 32: Vampire vs. ZombieVampire Team: Steve Niles (Screenwriter, 30 Days of Night), Scott Bowen (Author, The Vampire Survival Guide)Vampire Weapons": Vampire Bite, ClawsZombie Team: Max Brooks (Author, World War Z), Matt Mogk (Founder, Zombie Research Society)Zombie "Weapons": Zombie Bite, Hands

This is the first episode to feature fictional entities, as well as the first episode to not use weapons (the warriors themselves are the weapons).
Featured are the 30 Days of Night apex predator vampires and the Night of the Living Dead slow moving zombies; clips of both films were seen multiple times throughout the episode.
The established rules used in this episode are that the zombie virus has the potential to spread to a vampire, sunlight will affect the vampires, the vampires can only be killed by removing/destroying its head or heart or by bleeding out, and the zombies can only be killed by destroying the brain.
To determine how many zombies a vampire could kill before getting overrun, Leif Becker, expert martial artist and world champion speed board breaker, tested metal claw gauntlets designed by Dave Baker to simulate a vampire's razor-sharp claws. He was surrounded by 12 zombie dummies on pulleys, and ripped apart 9 out of the 12 zombies targets.  Multiplied by 6 (to simulate the Vampire's superior strength and speed), that would be 54 zombies killed out of 72, with an average of 63, resulting in the ratio of zombies to vampires (63 to 1).
For close range, in order to get a baseline pressure reading, the zombie bite was simulated by a 100 lb rottweiler, named "Joey", that bit down on a load cell hidden in an attack sleeve which resulted in 255 lbs of pressure. For the vampire bite, an alligator, named "Ripper", was brought in to chomp down on a 10 lb load cell between two blocks, which resulted in 1,723 lbs of bite force. Then the forces were fed into an automated chomper designed by Geoff, changing the bite force and teeth for each creature. The zombie teeth killed a simulated vampire through bleed-out in 2:22, and the vampire teeth destroyed a zombie brain in 5 seconds.
For mid-range, the Vampire claw was matched against a horde of Zombie hands. For the Zombie hands, three world-class strongmen were blindfolded (to simulate the Zombies' random attack pattern) and instructed to rip at a ballistic gel torso until they removed the heart, killing the vampire in 58 seconds. To test the Vampire claw, one of the aforementioned strongmen slammed down on a pressure mat, the force generated was multiplied by 6 (to simulate the Vampire's super strength), generating a slash force with 8,820 lbs behind it, enough to penetrate a zombie gel head, destroying its brain and killing it in 1.07 seconds.
This is the third episode with no long-range weapons.
This is the first and only episode of season 3 where the least effective weapon was not in the same class as the most effective weapon.
For X-Factors, the Zombies had both the lowest and highest known scores of season 3, having a 9 in Intelligence and a perfect 100 in Endurance.
This is the only episode to have no edges given, and also has the fewest "weapons" tested, a total of 4 (compared to season 3's average of 6 weapons, season 2's average of 8 weapons, and season 1's range of 8 to 12 weapons.)
This is the first simulated battle where one team has a numerical advantage (3 Vampires vs. 189 Zombies), the first to have a granular appearance (so as to create the classic horror film look), the second to have kills with unlisted techniques (the vampires throw and stomp zombies to death), the second to use slow motion, and the third to have a female play a role.  It is also the longest running battle of the show, clocking at 3:36.
The male vampire who dies first has the highest body count of the show, killing 78 zombies by himself.
The vampires are the only warriors to outperform their opponents in every weapon category, but the Zombies outperformed the Vampires in X-Factors.
This is the only episode to end in a cliffhanger. Although the vampires won in the simulation, the head vampire was shown succumbing to the effects of the zombie virus at the end of the show (stemming from his earlier exposure to zombie fluids), ending in the words "to be continued."
This is the only match-up where a warrior has been given a 100 in a known X-Factor.Reenactment 32The battle begins at night inside an abandoned warehouse, where 189 zombies are searching for a food source. Somewhere inside the warehouse, 3 vampires rise from their resting coffins ready to feast. The lead vampire communicates to his comrades in hisses and growls, ordering them to split up. In a hallway, the male subordinate vampire rakes his claws on a wall. He uses his heightened senses to sniff out his prey and dashes down a corridor, jumping up a railed stairway until he comes to a wooden door. He puts his ear up next to the door listening for any commotion. A zombie suddenly smashes the door, startling the vampire. As the zombies begin to pour through the doorway, the vampire regains his wits and puts his claws to work, slashing and swiping 2 zombies who come through the door. He soon is overwhelmed and runs back to the corridor where the rest of the zombies have begun to come through the other exits, blocking all paths of escape. He goes to work again, using his claws to take down 76 zombies before being completely engulfed by the zombie horde. The zombies grab and begin to hold down the fatigued vampire as he calls for help. The female vampire and the lead vampire answer the male's cries, but are too late to help their friend, and look on in horror as the zombies hold him down and disembowel him. The lead vampire hisses to the female to run for it and they take off down a hallway with a door. As the lead opens the door, they are greeted by another horde of zombies. He bites the first zombie in the doorway in the top of the skull and shuts the door, holding it down along with the female vampire, who locks it behind them. Both of them take off down the way they came as the horde smashes through the door and shambles on through. The vampire duo soon arrives back to where the first horde came in and both begin to massacre the zombies, taking down 58 of them. Eventually, the female vampire is attacked from behind as a zombie bites through her neck, breaking her jugular vein. She throws the offending zombie at the wall and stomps another one dead before dying of blood loss herself, leaving the leader to fight 50 zombies on his own. The lead vampire continues to fight, killing 6 zombies as fatigue begins to set in. As he slows down, he is swarmed from all sides by zombies that try to hold him down. The vampire throws them all off, killing 4 and rakes a fifth across the face before it can get any closer. Out of breath, the lead vampire attempts to leave through an exit door, but retreats back inside as he sees the dawn breaking in front of him. The vampire comes face-to-face with the remaining 39 zombies, killing them one by one. He then punches the last one in the face and throws it against a wall, killing it. The vampire looks around to make sure all the zombies are dead, then raises his hand and roars in victory.Winner: Vampires'''

References

External links

Deadliest Warrior